Cities are a major topic for popular songs.
Music journalist and author Nick Coleman has gone as far as to say that apart from love, "pop is better on cities than anything else."

Popular music often treats cities positively, though sometimes they are portrayed as places of danger and temptation. In many cases, songs celebrate individual cities, presenting them as exciting and liberating. Not all genres share the tendency to be positive about cities; in Country music cities are often portrayed as unfriendly and dehumanizing, or seductive but full of sin. However, there are many exceptions, for example: Lady Antebellum's song "This City" and Danielle Bradbery's "Young in America",.

Lyricist and author Sheila Davis writes that including a city in a song's title helps focus the song on the concrete and specific, which is both more appealing and more likely to lead to universal truth than abstract generalizations. Davis also says that songs with titles concerning cities and other specific places often have enduring popularity.

The following is a list of songs about cities, from both traditional and pop music: the list should not be considered complete.

Albania

Tirana
 "Shkupi, Tirana, Prishtina" by Adrian Gaxha
 "Tirona" by West Side Family

Algeria

Algiers
 "Alger" by Jean Leloup
 "Alger Alger" by Lili Boniche
 "Bahdja Bida" by Dahmane El Harrachi
 "Broken Flag" by Patti Smith

Oran
 "Rouhi ya Wahrane" by Khaled

Tizi Ouzou
 "Tizi Ouzou" by Idir & Maxime Le Forestier
 "Idrar Inu" by Idir

Armenia

Yerevan
 "No moles left in Irevan", by Jabbar Garyaghdioglu
 "Hey Jan Yerevan" by Willi Tokarev
"Yerevan Jan" by Levon Malkhasyan

Argentina

Buenos Aires
 "Anclao en París" by Enrique Cadícamo
 "Boskie Buenos" by Maanam
 "Buenos Aires sólo es piedra" by Alas
 "Buenos Aires" by Benjamin Biolay
 "Buenos Aires" by Iz*One
 "Buenos Aires" by Dom La Nena
 "Buenos Aires" by Fito Páez
 "Buenos Aires" by Tim Rice and Andrew Lloyd Webber
 "Buenos Aires" by Xoel López
 "Buenos Aires" by Rafa Pons
 "Cafetín de Buenos Aires" by Roberto Goyeneche
 "Cae el Sol" by Soda Stereo
”Ciudad Mágica” by Tan Bionica
 "Chiquilín de Bachín", tango by Ástor Piazzolla and Horacio Ferrer
 "En la Ciudad de la Furia" by Soda Stereo
 "Mañana en el Abasto" by Sumo
 "María de Buenos Aires" by Ástor Piazzolla
 "Mi Buenos Aires querido" by Carlos Gardel
 "No bombardeen Buenos Aires" by Charly García
 "No tan Buenos Aires" by Andrés Calamaro
 "Santa Maria (Del Buen Ayre)" by Gotan Project
 "Rapsodia Porteña" by Juan María Solare
 "Villa Crespo" by Juan María Solare
 "Villa Kreplaj" by Juan María Solare

Rosario
 "Tema de Piluso" by Fito Páez

Ushuaia
 "Anochecer en Ushuaia" by Juan María Solare

Córdoba
 "Soy Cordobés" by Rodrigo

Azerbaijan

Baku
 "Baku" by Tofig Guliyev
 "Baku" by VO5
 "Baku" by Muslim Magomayev
 "Baku" by Rashid Behbudov
 "Baku" by Iosif Kobzon
 "Mercy Baku" by DJ Smash

Australia

Adelaide
 "Adelaide" by Ben Folds
 "Adelaide" by John Cale
 "Adelaide" by Paul Kelly
 "Adelaide" by Anberlin
 "Adelaide" by the Rockfords
 "Adelaide You're Beautiful" by Judith Durham
 "Best Western" by Bad Astronaut
 "Came from Adelaide" by Coodabeen Champions
 "Charades" by Cog
 "City of Light" by Hilltop Hoods
 "Hindley Street" by Powderfinger
 "Home and Broken Hearted" by Cold Chisel
 "Howl at the Moon" by Don Walker
 "In South Australia I Was Born" by Greg Champion
 "Largs Pier Hotel" by Jimmy Barnes
 "Lost in Adelaide" by Spiderbait
 "Mr Bad Example" by Warren Zevon
 "Northern" by Bad Dreems
 "One More Boring Night in Adelaide" by Redgum
 "Sitting in a Bar in Adelaide" by Skyhooks
 "Town With No Cheer" by Tom Waits
 "Welcome to Adelaide" by Snog

Alice Springs
 "46 Miles from Alice" by Catherine Britt
 "88k from Alice" by Greg Champion
 "A Town Like Alice" by Ted Egan
 "Alice" by Dick Diver
 "Alice Springs" by Coloured Stone
 "Alice Springs" by Liz Phair
 "Alice Springs" by Mystery Jets
 "Alice Springs" by John Williamson
 "Alice Springs Rodeo" by Ted Egan
 "Alice Springs Waltz" by Herbie Laughton
 "The Ghan To Alice Springs" by Buddy Williams
 "Such a Beautiful Thing" by Ian Moss
 "Warakurna" by Midnight Oil
 "When The Snow Falls On The Alice" by Lee Kernaghan

Ballarat
 "Ballarat" by The Lemonheads
 "Died in Ballarat" by Mick Thomas' Roving Commission

Bathurst
 "Australian Boy" by Lee Kernaghan
 "The Bathurst Rebellion" by Lionel Long
 "Bathurst to L.A." by Penny Davies and Roger Ilott
 "Boys From Bathurst" by Lee Kernaghan
 "Four Walls" by Cold Chisel

Bendigo
 "Bendigo" by Matt Taylor
 "Bendigo, Welcome Stranger" by Keith Glass
 "Bendigo Rock" by Russell Morris
 "The Kid from Bendigo" by Reg Lindsay
 "Lady from Bendigo" by Eric Bogle
 "Shazza and Michelle" by ROOT!

Brisbane
 "The Battle of Brisbane" by The Pogues
 "Big Old Car" by Adam Brand, Cold Chisel
 "Brisbane" by The Wiggles
 "Brisbane '82" by John Kennedy
 "Brisbane, 1933" by The Gin Club
 "Brisbane City" by Joel Turner
 "Brisbane Girl" by Penny Davies and Roger Ilott
 "Brisbane Ladies" by The Bushwhackers
 "Brisbane Love Song" by Sun Kil Moon
 "Brisbane (Security City) by The Saints
 "Brisbane to Beechworth" by Matt Taylor
 "Brisvegas" by John Kennedy's 68 Comeback Special
 "Buckin' Brisbane Broncos" by Jim Haynes
 "Coming Home" by Sheppard
 "Conversation with a Brisbane Cab Driver" by Rob Snarski
 "Darkside" by Kev Carmody
 "Departures (Blue Toowong Skies)" by Bernard Fanning
 "Dreamworld" by Midnight Oil
 "Fortitude Valley" by Mick Thomas
 "Fortitude Valley" by Wagons
 "Fri Night in Brisbane" by Robbie Dunn
 "Growing Up in Brisbane" by Riptides
 "Hills of Brisbane" by James Blundell
 "Inferno (Brisbane In Summer)" by Robert Forster
 "I've Been Drunk in Every Pub in Brisbane" by the Chats
 "Living South of the Freeway" by Kev Carmody
 "London... Paris... Bracken Ridge!" by The Onyas
 "Meet Me In The Mall In Brisbane" by Judith Durham
 "Moreton Bay" by John Denver
 "No-one Loves Brisbane Like Jesus" by John Williamson
 "No Sleep 'Til Brisbane" by The Amity Affliction
 "Nuclear Device (The Wizard of Aus)" by The Stranglers
 "Pig City" by Spiral Stairs
 "Queensland University" by Custard
 "See You Again" by Catfish
 "Snake Skin Lady" by Robert Forster
 "Streets of Your Town" by The Go-Betweens
 "Thought I Was Over You" by Jack Frost
 "Trees of Brisbane" by Charles Jenkins

Broken Hill
 "Broken Hill" by Stephen Rowe
 "The Bus to Broken Hill" by John Dengate
 "Inside a Fireball" by Hunters & Collectors
 "This is Not the Way Home" by The Cruel Sea
 "Truthful Fella" by Slim Dusty

Cairns
 "Bye Bye Pride" by The Go-Betweens
 "Cairns" by Emma Russack
 "Cairns" by Mikey Young
 "Christmas in Cairns" by The Ten Tenors

Canberra
 "Australia's Canberra" by Judith Durham
 "Canberra's Calling to You" by Jack Lumsdaine
 "Canberra, We're Watching You" by Dalvanius and the Fascinations
 "Dickson" by Cosmic Psychos
 "Gough" by The Whitlams
 "Yarralumla Wine" by Redgum

Coffs Harbour
 "Coffs Harbour Blues" by Hard-Ons
 "Harry Was a Bad Bugger" by Tex, Don and Charlie
 "Russell Crowe's Band" by Frenzal Rhomb

Darwin
 "Aralia" by Leah Flanagan
 "Darwin" by Don Walker
 "Darwin (Big Heart Of The North)" by Slim Dusty
 "Darwin is da Winner" by Judith Durham
 "Darwin Jailhouse Window" by Tex Morton
 "Santa Never Made It into Darwin" by Bill and Boyd
 "She’s On Again In Darwin" by Ted Egan
 "Song for Darwin" by Ayers Rock
 "Tojo" by Hoodoo Gurus

Fremantle
 "The Catalpa" by The Real McKenzies
 "Shine" by The Scientists

Gladstone
 "Gladstone Pier" by Redgum

Glenorchy
 "The Glenorchy Bunyip" by Augie March

Gold Coast
 "Elly" by Kev Carmody
 "Gold Coast" by Violent Soho
 "Gold Coast Man" by Dan Kelly
 "Over The Border" by Skyhooks
 "Runaway Bay" by Ghostwriters
 "Surfers Paradise The Musical" by Tripod

Hobart
 "Hobart Obit" by Augie March
 "Happy Years I Spent in Hobart" by Judith Durham

Kalgoorlie
 "Kalgoorlie" by Tim Rogers and the Temperance Union
 "Kalgoorlie" by The Peep Tempel
 "King of Kalgoorlie" by Slim Dusty
 "The Golden Mile" by Spy vs Spy

Launceston
 "Launceston" by Icecream Hands

Melbourne

Mount Isa
 "Back at the Isa" by John Williamson
 "Carless in Isa" by Don Walker
 "City of Mount Isa" by Slim Dusty
 "Isa Rodeo" by Slim Dusty
 "Only Road You Know" by Chris LeDoux

Newcastle
 "Star Hotel" by Cold Chisel
 "The Newcastle Song" by Bob Hudson

Perth
 "Arsehole of the Universe" by The Scientists
 "I Love Perth" by Pavement
 "Jeremy Joy" by The Triffids
 "Perth" by Bon Iver
 "Perth" by Beirut
 "Perth is a Culture Shock" by The Victims
 "Perth Girls" by Abbe May
 "Perth Traumatic Stress Disorder" by Alex Lahey
 "Sleepy Little Deathtoll Town" by The Panda Band
 "South Perth" by Bernie Hayes
 "When Perth is on the East Side" by Judith Durham

Port Lincoln
 "Cool Hand Lukin" by Paul Kelly
 "Drinkin in Port Lincoln" by Cold Chisel

Queanbeyan
 "Queanbeyan" by Jack Lumsdaine

Rockhampton
 "Six Hours to Brisbane" by Halfway

Sydney

Tamworth
 "Big Trucks Are Rolling Into Tamworth" by Greg Champion
 "Clouds Over Tamworth" by John Williamson
 "The Devil Went Down to Tamworth" by Pixie Jenkins
 "Everybody Knows Why Everybody Goes To Tamworth" by Smoky Dawson
 "Gotta Get Back To Tamworth" by Johnny Chester
 "Tamworth" by Topp Twins
 "Tamworth (the song)" by Norma O'Hara Murphy
 "Tamworth the Great Country Star" by Stan Coster

Toowoomba
 "1990's" by Custard

Townsville
 "I Was Only Nineteen" by Redgum
 "Showtime" by Cold Chisel

Woolongong
 "Beachcomber from Woolongong" by John Williamson
 "Wollongong the Brave"  by Aunty Jack

Austria

Friedberg 
 "Friedberg" by Anna F.

Fürstenfeld 
 Fürstenfeld by S.T.S.

Salzburg
 "Salzburg" by Worakls

Vienna
 "Ganz Wien" by Falco
 "Vienna Calling" by Falco
 "Wiener Blut" by Falco
 "Vienna" by Matt Costa
 "Vienna" by Billy Joel
 "Vienna" by Ultravox
 "Vienna" by The Fray
 "Wien, Wien nur du allein" by Fritz Wunderlich
 "Vienne" by Barbara
 "Dear Vienna" by Owl City
 "Visit to Vienna" by Sahara Hotnights
 "Take This Waltz" by Leonard Cohen

Belgium

Aalst
 "Aalst (stad mijner dromen)" by Raymond van het Groenewoud

Antwerp
 "Antwerpen" by Enter Shikari

Bruges
 "Le carillonneur de Bruges" by Lina Margy
 "Mon père disait" by Jacques Brel

Brussels
 "BX vibes" by Scylla
 "Brussel" by Johan Verminnen
 "Brussel"  by Liesbeth List. Melody based on 'Bruxelles' by Jacques Brel.
 "Brussels by night" by Raymond van het Groenewoud
 "Brussels is on my side" by Milow
 "Bruxelles" by Jacques Brel
 "Bruxelles" by Bénabar
 "Bruxelles" by Dick Annegarn
 "BruxellesVie" by Damso
 "Funky'n Brussels" by Lost Frequencies
 "Il pleut sur Bruxelles" by Dalida
 "In de Rue des Bouchers" by Johan Verminnen
 "Just like Belgium" by Elton John
 "Liège Bruxelles Gand" by Baloji
 "Manneken Pis" by Maurice Chevalier
 "Bruxelles" by Boulevard des airs
 "Bruxelles arrive" by Roméo Elvis featuring Caballero
 "Bruxelles je t'aime" by Angèle

Knokke
 "Knokke-le-Zoute Tango" by Jacques Brel
 "Jacky" by Jacques Brel

Liège
 "Il neige sur Liège" by Jacques Brel
 "Liège Bruxelles Gand" by Baloji

Ostende
 "Ostende" by Alain Bashung
 "Comme à Ostende" by Arno, Bernard Lavilliers

Waterloo
 "Waterloo" by ABBA
 "Walking Back To Waterloo" by Bee Gees

Bosnia & Herzegovina

Sarajevo
 "Christmas Eve/Sarajevo 12/24" by Savatage and Trans-Siberian Orchestra
 "Je l' Sarajevo gdje je nekad bilo" by Dino Merlin
 "Sarajevo" by Ekatarina Velika
 "Sarajevo" by Dino Merlin
 "Sarajevo" by Kultur Shock
 "Sarajevo ljubavi moja" by Kemal Monteno
 "Miss Sarajevo" by Bono
 "Primavera a Sarajevo" by Enrico Ruggeri
 "Anarhija All Over Baščaršija" by Zabranjeno Pušenje
 "Baščarši Hanumen" by Elvis J. Kurtović & His Meteors

Brazil

Brasília
 "A Ponte" by Lenine
 "Te Amo Brasília" by Alceu Valença

Fortaleza
 "As Velas do Mucuripe" by Fagner

Londrina
 "Londrina" by Arrigo Barnabé

Porto Alegre
 "Anoiteceu em Porto Alegre" by Engenheiros do Hawaii
 "Horizontes" by Kleiton & Kledir
 "Deu Pra Ti" by Kleiton & Kledir

Recife
 "Coração Bobo" by Alceu Valença
 "La Belle de Jour" by Alceu Valença
 "No Romper da Aurora" by Alceu Valença
 "Para um amor no Recife" by Paulinho da Viola
 "Recife, minha cidade" by Reginaldo Rossi

Rio de Janeiro

Salvador
 "Na Baixa do Sapateiro" by Ary Barroso
 "We are the World of Carnival" by Asa de Águia
 "Salvador" by Claudia Leitte

São Paulo
 "Avenida Paulista" by Rita Lee
 "Isto é São Paulo" by Demônios da Garoa
 "Não existe amor em SP" by Criolo
 "Rua Augusta" by Ronnie Cord
 "Sampa" by Caetano Veloso
 "São Paulo" by 
 "São Paulo" by Chic
 "São Paulo" by Deadstring Brothers
 "São Paulo" by Flying Lotus
 "São Paulo" by Guillemots
 "São Paulo" by Inocentes
 "São Paulo" by Mallu Magalhães
 "São, São Paulo" by Tom Zé

Canada

Calgary
 "Actually, I'm Just Wearing Your Glasses" by Empire! Empire! (I Was a Lonely Estate)
 "Calgary" by Bon Iver
 "Calgary Girls" by The Smith Street Band
 "Hippies in Calgary" by Chris LeDoux
 "I Will Follow You Into the Dark" by Death Cab for Cutie

Gaspé
 "Canadian Railroad Trilogy" by Gordon Lightfoot

Halifax
 "Hello City" by Barenaked Ladies
 "Knockbacks in Halifax" by Weddings Parties Anything
 "Love This Town" by Joel Plaskett

Montreal

Saskatoon
 "A Little bit South of Saskatoon" by Sonny James
 "Girl in Saskatoon" by Johnny Cash
 "I Left a Love Note on the Wall in Saskatoon" by Painted Thin
 "Runnin' Back To Saskatoon" by The Guess Who
 "Wheat Kings" by the Tragically Hip

Regina
 "Regina I Don't Want to Fight" by Library Voices

Toronto

Vancouver

Winnipeg 
 "One Great City!" by The Weakerthans
 "Left and Leaving" by The Weakerthans
 "Civil Twilight" by The Weakerthans 
 "Pamphleteer" by The Weakerthans 
 "This Is A Fire Door Never Leave Open" by The Weakerthans
 "Heart of the Continent" by John K. Samson 
 "Maryland Bridge" by John K. Samson 
 "Prairie Town" by Randy Bachman, Neil Young, Margo Timmins. 
 "Winnipeg Is a Frozen Shithole" by Venetian Snares
 "Winnipeg Sidestep" by Sherbert
 "All That I Know" by Winnipeg's Most
 "Winterpeg" by Cancer Bats
 "Exodus of the Year" by Royal Canoe

Sudbury 
 "Sudbury Saturday Night" by Stompin' Tom Connors

Chile

Santiago
 "Y si no fuera" by Chico Trujillo
 "Santiago" by Los Tetas
 "A mi ciudad" by Santiago del Nuevo Extremo

Valparaíso
 "Monte Cristo" by Indochine
 "Valparaíso" by Pauline Croze
 "Valparaíso" by Sting
 "Valparaíso" by Osvaldo Rodríguez
 "Valparaíso" by Dominique A

Puerto Montt
 "Puerto Montt" by Los Iracundos

China

Beijing
 "Nine Million Bicycles" by Katie Melua
 "Indochine (Les 7 jours de Pékin)" by Indochine

Shanghai
 "夜上海" (Shanghai nights) by Zhou Xuan
 "Shangaï" by Indochine
 "Shanghai Breezes" by John Denver

Congo, Democratic Republic of the

Kinshasa
 "Françafrique" by Tiken Jah Fakoly
 "Kinshasa" by Tabu Ley Rochereau

Colombia

Barranquilla
 "En Barranquilla me quedo" by Joe Arroyo
 "Hombre caimán (Se va el caimán)" by

Bogotá
 "Bajo el sol de Bogotá" by León Gieco
 "Bogotá" by Criolo
"Suéltame, Bogotá" by Diamante Eléctrico
"Te amo Bogotá" by The Mills

Buenaventura
 "Buenaventura y Caney" by Grupo Niche

Cali
 "Cali Pachanguero" by Grupo Niche
"Oiga, mire, vea" by Orquesta Guayacán

Medellín
 "Listo Medellín" by Grupo Niche
"Medellín" by Maluma
"Medellalo" by Blessd

Santa Marta 

 "Cumbiana" by Carlos Vives

Quibdó 

 "De donde vengo yo" by ChocQuibTown

Croatia

Pula 
 "Maja" by KUD Idijoti

Rijeka 
 "Tarantella Fiumana" by Belfast Food
 "Sićaš li se lungo mare" by Vinko Coce
 "Riječko veče" by Ivo Robić
 "Rijeka" by Paraf
 "Riječke pičke" by Let 3

Sinj 
 "Sinju Grade" by Drazen Zanko ft. Vinko Coce

Split 
 "Cvit Mediterana" by Oliver Dragojević
 "Ispod sunca zlatnoga" by Oliver Dragojević
 "Oj, joj, vlaju moj" by Drazen Zanko, Thompson, Vuco
 "Marjane, Marjane" by Mišo Kovač
 "Marjane, Marjane" by Ivo Tijardović
 "Nima Splita do Splita" by Tereza Kesovija
 "Ništa kontra Splita" by Dino Dvornik
 "Splite moj" by Oliver Dragojević

Vinkovci 
 "Dođi u Vinkovce" by Shorty ft. Miroslav Stivčić

Vukovar 
 "Vukovar" by Nenad Bach ft. Klapa Sinj
 "Hiljadu poruka za sreću" by Del Arno Band

Zagreb 
 "041" by Azra
 "Užas je moja furka" by Azra
 "Zagreb" by Električni Orgazam

Cuba

Guantánamo
 "Guantanamera" by Joseíto Fernández

Havana
 "Havana" by Camila Cabello
 "Havana" by Kenny G
 "Habana" by Fito Páez
 "Habáname" by Carlos Varela
 "Hermosa Habana" by Los Zafiros
 "Habanization" by Raúl Paz
 "Habaneando" by X Alfonso
 "La flaca" by Jarabe de Palo

Santiago de Cuba
 "Iré a Santiago" by Ana Belén, lyrics by Federico García Lorca (in his book "Poet in New York")

Czech Republic

Prague
 "Prague" by Rika Zaraï
 "Prague" by Muse
 "The song i dreamt about Prague" by Arik Einstein

Lidice
 "Lidice" by Juan María Solare

Cyprus
 "Aphrodite" by Dawnstar

Limassol
 "Limassol" by Maxïmo Park

Denmark

Copenhagen

Holsterbro 
 "En sød student fra Holsterbro" by Dorthe Kollo

Skanderborg 
 "Gid du var i Skanderborg" by Dorthe Kollo

Dominican Republic

San Pedro de Macorís
 "San Pedro de Macorís" by Juan Luis Guerra

Ecuador

Guayaquil
 "Guayaquil city" by Mano Negra

Egypt

Alexandria 
 "Alexandrie" by Georges Moustaki
 "Alexandrie, Alexandra" by Claude François
 "شط إسكندرية / Shatt Iskindiriya" (The Beach of Alexandria) by Fairuz
 "Ya Iskindiriya" by Sheikh Imam

Cairo 
 "Digitalism in Cairo" by Digitalism
 "Fire in Cairo" by The Cure
 "Night Boat to Cairo" by Madness
 "Road to Cairo" by David Ackles
 "Skies over Cairo" by Django Django
 "Al Qahira" by Amr Diab ft. Mohamed Mounir

Finland

Helsinki
 "Haloo Helsinki" by Haloo Helsinki!
 "Helsinki" by Waltari
 (see also List of songs about Helsinki at Finnish Wikipedia)

France

Ajaccio
 "Ajaccio" by Tino Rossi
 "D'ajaccio A Bonifacio" by Tino Rossi

Amiens
 "Amiens c'est aussi le tien" by Les Fatals Picards

Angers
 "Framboise" by Boby Lapointe

Annecy
 "Annecy" by Véronique Sanson

Avignon
 Sur le Pont d'Avignon (traditional)

Biarritz
 "Biarritz" by Luis Mariano
 "Roche" by Sebastien Tellier

Bordeaux
 "Bordeaux" by Durutti Column

Brest
 "Brest" by Miossec
 "Recouvrance" by Miossec
 "A Recouvrance" by Marc Ogeret

Caen
 "Bermudes" by Fauve
 "Dans ma ville, on traîne" by Orelsan
 "2010" by Orelsan
 "Logo dans le ciel" by Orelsan
 "La gare de Caen" by Les Hurlements d'Léo

Calais
 "Dover–Calais" by Style

Cherbourg-Octeville
 "Cherbourg avait raison" by Frida Boccara
 "Les parapluies de Cherbourg" by Michel Legrand from The Umbrellas of Cherbourg
 "On attendra l'hiver" by Julien Doré
 "Cherbourg" by Beirut

Clermont-Ferrand 
 "Quel temps fait-il à Clermont-Ferrand?" by Flying Tractors

Dijon
 "Dijon" by Yves Jamait

La Rochelle
 "La Ville de La Rochelle" by Tri Yann
 "Les Tours de La Rochelle" by Les Binuchards

Le Havre
 "Le Havre" by Péniche

Lille
 "Fleur de Lille" by Parov Stelar
 "Lille" by Voyou
 "Lille" by Lisa Hannigan
 "Fille de Lille" by Balbino Medellin

Lyon
 "Lyon Presqu'île" by Benjamin Biolay
 "Saint-Jean Croix-Rousse" by Zen Zila
 "Lyon-sur-Saône" by Bernard Lavilliers
 "Les Canuts" (Traditional) by Yves Montand

Marseille
 "Bad boys de Marseille" by Akhenaton
 "Coast of Marseille" by Jimmy Buffett
 "Dimanche aux goudes" by Massilia Sound System
 "Last Train to Marseilles" by Richard Clapton
 "Le temps que j'arrive à Marseille" by Claude François
 "Marseille" by Patrick Fiori
 "Marseille mon pays" by Tino Rossi
 "Marseille sans bateau" by Nicoletta
 "Marseilles" by The Angels
 "Schlaflos in Marseille" by Feine Sahne Fischfilet
 "Tais-toi Marseille" by Barbara

Montpellier
 "Montpellier" by Johnny Hallyday
 "Montpellier Sound System" by Stevo's Teen

Nancy
 "Nancy" by Oldelaf

Nantes
 "Nantes" by Barbara
 "Nantes" by Beirut
 "Dans les prisons de Nantes", traditional folk song covered by Tri Yann
 "Nantes" by Renan Luce
 "Sur le pont de Nantes" by Guy Béart
 "Sophie de Nantes" by Pigalle

Nice
 "Nissa La Bella" by Menica Rondelly
 "Nice, baie des anges" by Dick Rivers
 "Nice in Nice" by The Stranglers

Orléans
 "Maid of Orléans" by Dark Moor
 "Maid of Orléans" by Orchestral Manoeuvres In The Dark

Paris

Pau
 "Bèth cèu de Pau" by Marcel Amont

Reims
 "Reims" by Louis Garrel

Roubaix
 "Roubaix mon Amour" by Julien Doré

Rouen
 "Road to Rouen" by Supergrass

Saint-Étienne
 "Saint-Étienne" by Bernard Lavilliers

St. Tropez
 "Douliou-Douliou Saint-Tropez" by Geneviève Grad
 "Don't Play" by Halsey
 "San Tropez" by Pink Floyd
 "Saint-Tropez" by Post Malone
 "Saint Tropez" by Ricky Martin

Strasbourg
 "Un dimanche à Strasbourg" by Les Wampas
 "Strasbourg" by The Rakes

Toulouse
 "Bis nach Toulouse" by Philipp Poisel
 "Toulouse" by Claude Nougaro
 "Toulouse" by Is Tropical
 "Toulouse" by Les Wampas
 "Toulouse" by Dutch DJ Nicky Romero
 "Toulouse" by Zebda
 "Goodbye Toulouse" by The Stranglers
 "Ma Ville Est Le Plus Beau Parc" by Fabulous Trobadors

Vesoul
 "Vesoul" by Jacques Brel

Germany

Berlin

Bochum
 "Bochum" by Herbert Grönemeyer

Chemnitz
 "Karl-Marx-Stadt" by Kraftklub

Cologne
 "Am Bickendorfer Büdche" by Bläck Fööss
 "Am Dom zo Kölle, zu Kölle am Rhing" by Bläck Fööss
 "Dat Wasser vun Kölle" by Bläck Fööss
 "Du bess die Stadt" by Bläck Fööss
 "En De Weetschaff Op D'r Eck" by Bläck Fööss
 "En unserem Veedel" by Bläck Fööss
 "Et Südstadt Leed" by Bläck Fööss
 "Mer Losse d'R Dom in Kölle" by Bläck Fööss
 "Mir sin die Weltmeister vum Ring" by Bläck Fööss
 "Unser Stammbaum" by Bläck Fööss
 "Rut un wiess" by Bläck Fööss
 "Mir Kölsche" by Bläck Fööss
 "Lange Samstag En D'r City" by Bläck Fööss
 "Kölle Du Uns Stadt am Rhein" by Bläck Fööss
 "Kölsche Jung" by Brings
 "Köln Kalk Ehrenmord" by Eko Fresh
 "Ävver et Hätz bliev he in Kölle" by Höhner and Stefan Raab
 "Hey Kölle" by Höhner
 "Viva Colonia" by Höhner
 "Heimweh nach Köln" by Willi Ostermann
 "Köln hat was zu bieten" by Paveier
 "Stadt mit K" by Kasalla
 "Liebe deine Stadt" by Mo-Torres, Cat Ballou and Lukas Podolski
 "Et jitt kei Wood" by Cat Ballou
 "Du bes Kölle" by Tommy Engel
 "Mir han e Hätz für Kölle" by Bläck Fööss
 "wenn mir Kölsche singe" by Bläck Fööss
 " Unser Jrundjesetz" by Bläck Fööss
 "Wo mir sin is Kölle" by Höhner
 "Mer stonn zo dir; FC Kölle-Hymne auf den 1. FC Köln" by Höhner
 "Dä kölsche Pass" by Höhner
 "Dat Hätz vun dr Welt" by Höhner
 "Halleluja" by Brings, Lukas Podolski
 "Bütze de Luxe" by Bläck Fööss
 "Sansi Bar" by Höhner
 "Ungerm Mond vun Kölle" by Brings
 "Kölsche Bröck" by Bläck Fööss
 "Kölsche Jung" by Willy Millowitsch
 "Das geht nie vorbei" by Höhner
 "Ming Stadt" by Cat Ballou
 "König" by Cat Ballou
 "Blootwoosch, Kölsch un e lecker Mädche" by Höhner
 "Mem Müllemer Böötchen" by Bläck Fööss
 "Kölle, du bes bunt" by Brings
 "Jeck Yeah!" by Brings
 "Köln ist einfach korrekt" by Wise Guys
 "Weil ich ein Kölner bin" by Wise Guys
 "Caminata nocturna (por Colonia)" by Juan María Solare
 "Schäl Sick" by Bläck Fööss

Delmenhorst
 "Delmenhorst" by Element of Crime

Döbeln
 "Döbeln in the Sky" by Dekadance

Dresden
 "Dresden" by Cold Chisel
 "Dresden" by Stuart Davis
 "Dresden" by The Slow Show
 "Dressed in Dresden" by The Hundred in the Hands

Düsseldorf
 "Altbierlied" by Die Toten Hosen
 "Düsseldorf" by Regina Spektor
 "Düsseldorf" by Broilers
 "Düsseldorf" by Teleman
 "Düsseldorf" by Bob Hund
 "Dusseldorf" by Little Heroes
 "La Düsseldorf" by La Düsseldorf
 "Meine Stadt" by Die Toten Hosen
 "Modestadt Düsseldorf" by Die Toten Hosen
 "Wärst du doch in Düsseldorf geblieben" by Dorthe Kollo
 "Wir sind Düsseldorfer Jungs" by Die Mimmi's

Erlangen 
 "Wissenswertes über Erlangen" by Foyer des Arts

Frankfurt 
 "Here Comes a City" by The Go-Betweens
 "Smog in Frankfurt" by Michael Holm
 "Winter in Frankfurt" by (Vega)

Frankfurt (Oder)
 "Frankfurt Oder" by Bosse feat. Anna Loos

Gelsenkirchen 
 "Gelsenkirchen" by Georg Kreisler

Göttingen 
 "Göttingen" by Barbara

Hamburg

Hameln
 "Pongamos que hablo de Hamelín" by Juan María Solare

Hamm
 "Hamm, Sweet Hamm" by

Hanover
 "Stadt mit Keks" by Matthias Brodowy

Heidelberg
 "I Lost my Heart in Heidelberg"
 "Heidelberg" by Kakkmaddafakka
 "Memories of Heidelberg" by Peggy March
 "Passacaglia über HEIDELBERG" by Juan María Solare
 "Wunderschön" by Torch

Heiligenstadt
 "Heiligenstadt oder der Rand des Abgrunds" by Juan María Solare

Kassel
 "Direkt aus Kassel" by

Königswinter
 "Es war in Königswinter" by Die 3 Colonias

Krefeld
 "Krefeld am Rhein" by Hörzu

Leipzig 
 "Leipzig" Matthew Herbert
 "Leipzig" Balthazar
 "Leipzig" Svavar Knútur
 "Leipzig" LOT
 "Leipzig steht in Flammen" Morlockk Dilemma
 "Live in Leipzig" The Baboon Show
 "Zu Leipzig auf der Messe" Kraudn Sepp
 "Leipziger Stilleben" Sebastian Krämer
 "Der Schnorrerpark bei Leipzig" Die Bockwurschtbude
 "Leipzig" Thomas Dolby
 "Leipzig Song" Sebastian Krumbiegel, GewandhausChor, GewandhausKinderchor
 "Leipzig in Trümmern" Wutanfall

Ludwigshafen
 "Gerne in Lu'" by Ulrich Zehfuß

Mannheim
 "Meine Stadt" by Söhne Mannheims
 "Meine Welt" (Jubilee song of 400 years of The City of Mannheim, by Joy Fleming, Rolf Stahlhofen and others)

Marienbad
 "Marienbad" by Barbara

München
 "München" by Spider Murphy Gang
 "Schickeria" by Spider Murphy Gang
 "Skandal im Sperrbezirk" by Spider Murphy Gang
 "Munich" by Editors
 "Via Munich" by Tony Sly

Nürnberg 
 "Nürnberg" by Hoelderlin
 "Nürnberg" by Herr Nilsson

Oberhausen
 "Oberhausen" by Missfits

Rostock
 "Mein Rostock" by Marteria

Stuttgart
 "1ste Liebe" by Max Herre
 "Mutterstadt" by Massive Töne
 "Killesberg Baby" by Thomas D

Wolfenbüttel 
 "Wolfenbüttel" by Bonaparte

Guinea-Bissau

Bissau
 "Sol Maior Para Comanda" by Super Mama Djombo

Greece

Athens
 "Keine Sterne in Athen (3-4-5 × in 1 Monat)" by Stephan Remmler
 "Weiße Rosen aus Athen / The White Rose of Athen" by Nana Mouskouri
 "Athina mana mou" by Bessy Argyraki
 "Athina mou" by Konstantinos Argyros

Piraeus
 "Never on Sunday" by Manos Hatzidakis

Thessaloniki
  "Sti Thessaloniki" by Kelly Kelekidou
 "Thessaloniki Mou" by Stelios Kazantzidis
 "S'anazito sti Saloniki" by Dimitris Mitropanos
 "Thessaloniki" by Dimitris Mitropanos
 "Geia Sou Mana Thessaloniki" by Zafeiris Melas
 "Thessaloniki Mou" by Giannis Parios
 "Fysa Vardari Mou" by Glykeria
 "Dikaioma mou" by Pashalis Terzis
 "Ta Ladadika" by Dimitris Mitropanos
 "Sto Lefko Ton Pyrgo" by Giorgos Zambetas

Hong Kong

Hong Kong
 "Hong Kong" by Gorillaz
 "Hong Kong"  by Ganymede
 "Hong Kong"  by Kōji Tamaki
 "香港地" by Edison Chen
 "香港‧香港" by Agnes Chan
 "香港之夜" by Teresa Teng
 "Hong Kong Kowloon" by 24Herbs
 "Below the Lion Rock" by Roman Tam
 "Ghost Ship" by Blur
 "Hong Kong Star" by France Gall

Hungary

Budapest
 "Budapest" by Pannonia Allstars Ska Orchestra
 "Budapest" by Jethro Tull
 "Budapest" by George Ezra
 "Hello Tourist" by Emil.RuleZ!
 "Jó éjt Budapest" by Katalin Karády

Iceland

Reykjavík 
 "Reykjavík" by Sykur
 "Reykjavík" by Els Amics de les Arts

Iran

Isfahan
 "Isfahan" by Duke Ellington
 "Isfahan" by Moein

Iraq

Baghdad
 "Je M'Appelle Bagdad" by Tina Arena
 "L'Uomo Di Bagdad, Il Cow Boy E Lo Zar" by Adriano Celentano
 "B.O.B. (Bombs over Baghdad)" by Outkast
 "Sadr City" by Corb Lund

Ireland

Dublin

Cork

Israel

Jerusalem

India

Agra
 "Agre Ka Lala Angreji Dulhan Laya Re" by Asha Bhosle, Usha Mangeshkar
 "Agre Ko Ghaagre Mangwa De Raja" by Lata Mangeshkar
 "Tum Dilli Main Agre Mere Dil Se Nikle Haaye" by Mohammed Rafi
 "Ghagra" by Vishal Dadlani, Rekha Bhardwaj

Ahmedabad
 "Amdavad Re" by Vishal Dadlani
 "Awesome Amdavad" by Mehul Surti, Osman Mir, Dhvanit Thaker, & Mirande Shah
 "Eke Lal Darwaje" by Harshida Raval
 "Mijaj Amdavadi" by Hiral Brahmbatt, Arvind Vegda, Ganshyam Gadhvi, Nisarg Trivedi
 "Hoo Amdavad No Rickshaa Walo" by Kishore Kumar

Amritsar
 "Ambarsariya" by Sona Mohapatra
 "Gallan Goodiyaan" by Shankar Mahadevan, Yashita Sharma, Manish Kumar Tipu, Farhan Akhtar, Sukhwinder Singh
 "Main Amritsar" by Nachhatar Gill
 "Main Nikla Gaddi Leke" by Udit Narayan
 "Munda Ambarsariya" by Pavneet Birgi

Badrinath
 "Omkareshwari" by Shankar Mahadevan, M. M. Keeravani

Bareilly
 "Aaja Nachle" by Sunidhi Chauhan
 "Jhumka Gira Re" by Asha Bhosle
 "Kajra Mohabbat Wala" by Asha Bhosle, Shamshad Begum
 "Sweety Tera Drama" by Dev Negi, Pawni Pandey, Shraddha Pandit
 "Thoda Sa Pagla" by Asha Bhosle
 "Woh To Baan Bareilly Se Aaya" by Jayshree

Bengaluru
 "Ayyayyayyo Hallimukka" by L. R. Eswari
 "Bengalooru Mangalooru" by Puneeth Rajkumar
 "Nam Ooru Bengaluru" by Gopi Sunder, Bryan Adams
 "Ringa Ringa" by Priya Himesh

Bikaner
 "Ayi Ayi Malaniya Bikaner Se" by Sudha Malhotra
 "Bikaner Ki Chunari Odhi Lahanga Pahna Jaipur Ka" by Asha Bhosle
 "Mai Hu Jaipur Ki Banjaran" by Mohammed Rafi, Lalita Devulkar
 "Mera naam hai Chameli" by Lata Mangeshkar

Bhopal
 "Thoda Sa Pagla" by Asha Bhosle

Chandigarh
 "Chandigarh" by Mankirt Aulakh
 "Chandigarh" by Raj Brar
 "Chandigarh Bouli Paendi" by Babbu Maan
 "Chandigarh Kare Aashiqui" by Jassi Sidhu
 "Chandigarh Rehn Waaliye" by Jenny Johal, Raftaar & Bunty Bains
 "Chandigarh Returns" by Ranjit Bawa
 "Chandigarh Waliye" by Sharry Mann
 "Dhaakad" by Raftaar
 "Kala Chashma" by Amar Arshi, Badshah, Neha Kakkar
 "Mohali" by Vinaypal Buttar
 "Poplin" by Diljit Dosanjh
 "Shehar Chandigarh Diyan Kudiyan" by Ammy Virk
 "Yaari Chandigarh Waliye" by Ranjit Bawa

Chennai
 "Bombay Ho Ya Madras" by S. P. Balasubrahmanyam
 "Chancey Illa" by Anirudh Ravichander
 "Chennai City Gangsta" by Anirudh Ravichander, Hard Kaur, Hiphop Tamizha, Country Chicken
 "Chennai Express" by S. P. Balasubrahmanyam, Jonita Gandhi
 "Madras" by Hariharasudhan, Meenakshi Iyer
 "Madras Dhost" by Krishnaraj, Anuradha Sriram and Naveen
 "Madras Nalla Madras" by T. M. Soundararajan
 "Madrasai Suthi" by Shahul Hameed, Swarnalatha, G. V. Prakash and Manorama
 "Main Bangali Chhokra, Main Madrasi Chhokri" by Mohammed Rafi and Asha Bhosle
 "Pattanathae Parka" by P. A. Periyanayaki
 "Porambokku Paadal" by T. M. Krishna
 "Spirit of Chennai" by C. Girinandh and Vikram featuring various artists
 "Sun Sun Madrasi Chhori " by Mohammed Rafi and Asha Bhosle
 "The Madras Song" by Shakthisree Gopalan

Dehradun
 "Mere Piya Gaye Rangoon" by Chitalkar Ramchandra, Shamshad Begum

Delhi
 "Bogi Bogi Bogi Yo Yo Yo" by G. M. Durrani and Shamshad Begum
 "Bombay Ho Ya Madras" by S. P. Balasubrahmanyam
 "Chalo Dilli" by Raja Hasan
 "Chor Bazaari" by Neeraj Shridhar and Sunidhi Chauhan
 "Delhi-6" by Blaaze, Benny Dayal, Tanvi Shah, Vivian Chaix, Claire
 "Delhi.com" by Mychael Danna
 "Delhi Destiny" by Raja Hassan
 "Delhi Shahar Mein Maro Ghaghro" by Ila Arun
 "Dhaakad" by Raftaar
 "Dil Jawani Ke Nashe Se Choor Hai" by Mohammed Rafi
 "Dil Ka Rishta Jod Diya Hai" by Kishore Kumar, Asha Bhosle
 "Dilli" by Rabbi Shergill
 "Dilli" by Tochi Raina, Shriram Iyer, Aditi Singh Sharma
 "Dilli Ke Baazar Ki Balma Sair Kara De" by Asha Bhosle
 "Dilli Ki Sardi" by Shweta Shetty, K.K.
 "Dilli Sara" by Kamal Khan and Kuwar Virk
 "Dilli Shehar" by Yash Kumar and Millind Gaba
 "Dilli Shehar Mein" by Ankit Singh and Antara Mitra
 "Dilli Shehar Diyan Kudhiyan" by Surinder Shinda
 "Dilli Tere Kile Par" by Suraiya
 "Dilliwaali Girlfriend" by Arijit Singh, Sunidhi Chauhan
 "Dilliwale Bure Nahi" by Shamshad Begum
 "Kajra Mohabbat Wala" by Asha Bhosle, Shamshad Begum
 "Kajra Re" by Alisha Chinoy, Shankar Mahadevan, Javed Ali and Amitabh Bachchan
 "Mehbooba" by Lata Mangeshkar, Vinod Rathod
 "Mithai Ki Dukan Meri Dilli Ke Bazaar" by Geeta Dutt
 "New Delhi Freight Train" by Little Feat
 "O Lilli Lilli Lilli" by Balbir and Geeta Dutt
 "Resham ka Rumal" by Ila Arun
 "Saddi Dilli" by Millind Gaba
 "Sanam Tu Chal Diya Rasta" by Mohammed Rafi
 "Sher Se Ladne Aayi Dekho" by Mohammed Rafi
 "Thoda Sa Pagla" by Asha Bhosle
 "Tum Dilli Main Agre Mere Dil Se Nikle Haaye" by Mohammed Rafi
 "Zaalim Dilli" by Jazzy B, Hard Kaur
 "Zameen Bhi Wohi Hai Wohi Aasmaan" by Mohammed Rafi

Goa
 "Abhi Abhi Mere Dil Mein" by Kunal Ganjawala, Sunidhi Chauhan
 "Goa" by Krish, Ranjith, Tanvi Shah, Suchitra, Chynk Showtyme & Pav Bundy
 "Rocking Goa" by Shankar Ehsaan Loy

Hyderabad
 "Poochh Rahi Hai Ladki Hyderabadi" by Alka Yagnik

Jaipur
 "Bikaner Ki Chunari Odhi Lahanga Pahna Jaipur Ka" by Asha Bhosle
 "Gulabi" by Jigar Sariya, Priya Saraiya
 "Jaipur Ki Choli" by Kishore Kumar, Asha Bhosle
 "Main Jaipur Ki Hoon Chhori" by Anuradha Paudwal
 "Mai Hu Jaipur Ki Banjaran" by Mohammed Rafi, Lalita Devulkar
 "Riding into Jaipur" by Paul McCartney

Jalandhar
 "Call Jalandhar Ton" by Harbhajan Mann
 "Iski Uski" by Akriti Kakkar, Shahid Mallya, Shankar Mahadevan

Kanpur
 "Kanpoora" by Indian Ocean

KanyaKumari
 "Bharatha Bhooshira" by S Janaki

Kolkata
 "Aami Shotti Bolchi" by Usha Uthup, Vishwesh Krishnamurthy
 "Amar Shawhore" by Anupam Roy
 "Ami Kolkatar Rashogolla" by Kavita Krishnamurti
 "Ami Miss Calcutta" by Arati Mukhopadhyay
 "Balam Calcutta Pahunch Gaye" by Asha Bhosle, Usha Mangeshkar
 "Bogi Bogi Bogi Yo Yo Yo" by G. M. Durrani and Shamshad Begum
 "Bombay Ho Ya Madras" by S. P. Balasubrahmanyam
 "C/o. Kolkata" by Usha Uthup
 "Calcutta" by Bing Crosby, Rosemary Clooney
 "Calcutta" by Lawrence Welk
 "Calcutta Kiss" by Imaad Shah, Saba Azad
 "Calcutta Pan Vesina" by Shankar Mahadevan and K. S. Chithra
 "Calcutta (Taxi Taxi Taxi)" by Dr. Bombay
 "Chahiye Thoda Pyar" by Kishore Kumar
 "Chalo Calcutta" by Bappi Lahiri and Sharon Prabhakar
 "Kashi Hile Patna Hile Kalkatta Hile La" by Manna Dey
 "Kolkata" by Anupam Roy and Shreya Ghoshal
 "Kolkata Te Bati Nai" by Usha Uthup
 "Kolkata Kolkata" by Usha Uthup 
 "Laga Nazariya Ka Dhakka" by Udit Narayan and Alka Yagnik
 "Na Champa Na Chameli" by Mamta Sharma
 "Oh, Calcutta!" by Dave Pell Singers
 "Shahron Mein Se" by Kishore Kumar
 "Sher Se Ladne Aayi Dekho" by Mohammed Rafi
 "Suno Ji Yeh Kalkatta Hai" by Mohammed Rafi from Howrah Bridge (film), music by O. P. Nayyar
 "Suno Suno Miss Chatterjee, Mere Dil Ka Matter Ji" by Mohammed Rafi and Asha Bhosle
 "Tomake Chai" by Suman Chatterjee
 "Yamaha Nagari" written by Veturi with the vocals of Hariharan.

Lucknow
 "Aye Shehar-E-Lucknow Tujhe" by Mohammed Rafi
 "Bullett Raja" by Keerthi Sagathia
 "In Ankhon Ki Masti Ke" by Asha Bhosle
 "Lucknow Chalo Ab Rani" by Geeta Dutt, G. M. Durrani
 "Suno Na Sangemarmar" by Arijit Singh
 "Thoda Sa Pagla" by Asha Bhosle
 "Yeh Lucknow Ki Sar Zameen" by Mohammed Rafi

Ludhiana
 "Naam Mera Nimmo Muqaam Ludhiana" by Lata Mangeshkar and Manna Dey

Mumbai
 "Aa Mumbai Chhe" by Manna Dey
 "Ai Dil Hai Mushkil Jeena Yahaan" by Mohammed Rafi and Geeta Dutt
 "Are Dekh Li Teri Bombai" by Kishore Kumar
 "Apna Bombay Talkies" by an ensemble cast including Udit Narayan and Alka Yagnik
 "Babu Samjho Ishare" by Kishore Kumar and Manna Dey
 "Bam Bam Bambai" by Amit Kumar
 "Bambai Humari Bambai" by Mohammed Rafi
 "Bambai Ne Paida Kiya" by Kishore Kumar
 "Bambai Se Aaya Mera Dost" by Bappi Lahiri
 "Bambai Se Gayi Poona" by Alka Yagnik
 "Bambai Shaam Ke Baad" by Asha Bhosle
 "Bambai Shahar Ki Tujko Chal Sair Kara Doon" by Kishore Kumar
 "Bom Bom Bombay Meri Hai" by Amit Kumar
 "Bombay" by Golden Earring
 "Bombay Ho Ya Madras" by S. P. Balasubrahmanyam
 "Bombay Ponnu" by Mamta Sharma
 "Bombay Purani Kalkatta Purana" by and Mohammed Rafi and Kamal Barot
 "Bombay Talkies (Duet)" by Kailash Kher, Richa Sharma
 "Bombay Theme" by A.R. Rahman
 "Bumbai Nagariya" by Bappi Lahiri, Vishal Dadlani, Nana Patekar, John Abraham
 "Chinchpokli Chinchpokli" by Shamshad Begum and Madan Mohan
 "Chuk Chuk Chak Chak Bombay Se Baroda Tak" by Usha Mangeshkar, Asha Bhosle, Mahesh Kumar
 "Dekhne Mein Bhola Hai" by Asha Bhosle
 "Dilliwale Bure Nahi" by Shamshad Begum
 "Ek Akela Is Shahar Mein" by Bhupinder Singh
 "Exotic" by Priyanka Chopra and Pitbull
 "Hawaii-Bombay" by Mecano
 "I Am Mumbai" by Javed Jaffrey
 "Lucknow Chalo Ab Rani" by Geeta Dutt, G. M. Durrani
 "Main Bombay Ka Babu" by Mohammed Rafi
 "Mumbai Ni Kamani" by Kishore Kumar
 "Mumbai Roke To Roke" by Kishore Kumar, Asha Bhosle
 "Mumbai One Way Nagari Hai" by Sukhwinder Singh, Ranjit Barot
 "Seene Mein Jalan, Aankhon Mein Toofaan" by Suresh Wadkar
 "Shake My Kamariya" by Mamta Sharma
 "Singh Is Kinng" by Snoop Dogg, RDB, Akshay Kumar
 "Tumse Jo Dekhte Hi Pyar Hua" by S. P. Balasubrahmanyam, Lata Mangeshkar
 "Ye Haseen Bambai Apne Ko To Jam Gayi" by Mahendra Kapoor, Mukesh
 "Yeh Bombai Shehar Ka Bada Naam Hai" by Mohammed Rafi
 "Yeh Bombay Shahar Hai" by Amit Kumar
 "Yeh Hai Bambai Nagariya" by Kishore Kumar
 "Yeh Hai Mumbai" by Sudesh Bhosle

Patiala
 "Laung Da Lashkara" by Jasbir Jassi, Mahalakshmi Iyer, Hard Kaur
 "Patiala Peg" by Diljit Dosanjh
 "Suit Patiala" by Ginni Mahi

Patna
 "Kashi Hile Patna Hile Kalkatta Hile La" by Manna Dey
 "Patna Ke Haat Par Nariyar" by Kavita Paudwal
 "Patna Wali" by Amit Kumar, Vinod Ralhora

Pune
 "Bambai Se Gayi Poona" by Alka Yagnik
 "Poona Se Laayi Main Paan Re" by Tanveer Naqvi, Rajjan, Hasrat Lakhnavi and Swami Ramanand Saraswati

Raipur
 "Sasural Genda Phool" by Rekha Bhardwaj, Shraddha Pandit, Sujata Mazumder, Mahathi

Vadodara
 "Chuk Chuk Chak Chak Bombay Se Baroda Tak" by Usha Mangeshkar, Asha Bhosle, Mahesh Kumar

Varanasi
 "Hum To Aise Hain" by Sunidhi Chauhan, Shreya Ghoshal, Swanand Kirkire & Pranab Biswas
 "Kaisa Jadoo Dala Ma Benarasi Roomalwaala" by Mohammed Rafi and Asha Bhosle
 "Khaike Pan Banaraswala" by Kishore Kumar
 "Purab Se" by Shreya Ghoshal
 "Resham ka Rumal" by Ila Arun
 "Thoda Sa Pagla" by Asha Bhosle
 "Yeh Hai Shaan Banaras Ki" by Pt. Sanjeev Abhyankar
 " Bham Bham Bole" by Hariharan, Shankar Mahadevan

Vrindavan
 "Brindavan Ka Krishan Kanhaiya" by Mohammed Rafi, Lata Mangeshkar

Italy

Bologna
 "Bologna" by Francesco Guccini
 "Bologna" by Wanda

Genoa
 "Genova per noi" by Paolo Conte
 "Ma se ghe pensu" by Bruno Lauzi
 "Bocca di Rosa" by Fabrizio de André
 "Mi canto Zena" by Franca Lai
 "Chi guarda Genova" by Ivano Fossati
 "Via del campo" by Fabrizio de André
 "Creuza de mä" by Fabrizio de André

Milan
 "Il Ragazzo della Via Gluck" by Adriano Celentano
 "Innamorati a Milano" by Memo Remigi
 "Luci a San Siro" by Roberto Vecchioni
 "Milano" by Ivano Fossati
 "Milano" by Lucio Dalla
 "Milano" by Alex Britti
 "Milano" by Edda
 "Milano 1968" by Le Orme
 "Milano circonvallazione esterna" by Afterhours
 "Milano e Vincenzo" by Alberto Fortis
 "Milano, Milano" by Articolo 31
 "Porta Romana" by Giorgio Gaber
 "Un romantico a Milano" by Baustelle
 "Milano" by Francesco Guccini
 "Nostalgia de Milan" by Giovanni D'Anzi
 "Nati a Milano" by Giorgio Faletti
 "Amo Milano" by Dargen D'Amico
 "Milano" by Calcutta
 "Mílanó" by Sigur Rós
 "Milano" by Russian Circles

Modena
 "Le donne di Modena" by Francesco Baccini
 "Modena" by Antonello Venditti

Naples
 "Napule è" by Pino Daniele

Pompeii
 "This Was Pompeii" by Dar Williams
 "Pompeii" by Bastille
 "Above the Clouds of Pompeii" by Bear's Den

Rimini
 "Rimini" by Les Wampas
 "Rimini" by Fabrizio de André

Rome
 "Arrivederci Roma" by Renato Rascel
 "Aroma a Roma (Sciopero)" by Juan María Solare
 "Autumn in Rome" by Peggy Lee
 "Dans les rues de Rome" by Dany Brillant
 "Fall of Rome" by James Reyne
 "In the Colosseum" by Tom Waits
 "On an Evening in Roma" by Dean Martin
 "Paseando por Roma" by Soda Stereo
 "Roma Capoccia" by Antonello Venditti
 "Romance in Rome" by Petula Clark
 "Roma Nuda" by Franco Califano
 "Rome" by Phoenix
 "Rome" by Lost Nation
 "Rome" by Yeasayer
 "Rome Wasn't Built in a Day" by Morcheeba
 "Rosaline" by Cold Chisel
 "The Burning of Rome (Cry for Pompeii)" by Virgin Steele
 "When in Rome" by Nickel Creek

Turin
 "Il cielo su Torino" by Subsonica
 "Torino" by Antonello Venditti

Venice
 "Beautiful Venice" by Joseph Philip Knight
 "Canale Grande Number One" by Peggy March
 "C'est Venice" by Toto Cutugno
 "L'Italie" by Christophe
 "Que C'est Triste Venise" by Charles Aznavour
 "Un trasatlántico entra a Venecia a la caída del sol" by Juan María Solare
 "Venezia" by Francesco Guccini
 "Venezia" by Hombres G
 "Venice Burning" by James LaBrie
 "Venice Is Sinking" by Spirit of the West
 "Venezia" by Vangelis

Verona
 "Verona Beat" by I Gatti Di Vicolo Miracoli
 "3ww" by ALT-J

Ivory Coast

Abidjan
 "Cocody Rock!" by Alpha Blondy

Jamaica

Kingston
 "Concrete Jungle" by The Wailers
 "Funky Kingston" by Toots and The Maytals
 "Jamaica Farewell" by Harry Belafonte
 "Kingston Town" by UB40
 "Natty Dread" by Bob Marley & The Wailers
 "No Woman, No Cry" by Bob Marley & The Wailers
 "Trench Town" by Bob Marley & The Wailers
 "Trenchtown Rock" by The Wailers
 "Kingstown 14" by Gregory Isaacs
 "Kingston, Kingston" by Lou & the Hollywood Bananas

Montego Bay
 "Montego Bay" by Bobby Bloom

Japan

Fukuoka 
 "Bachata en Fukuoka" by Juan Luis Guerra

Hiroshima 
 "Hiroshima" by Ben Folds
 "Hiroshima" by Sandra
 "Hiroshima Mon Amour" by Alcatrazz

Kyoto 
 "Alone in Kyoto" by Air
 "Burning Airlines Give You So Much More" by Brian Eno
 "Gion-cho" by Band-Maiko
 "Japanese Hands" by Elton John
 "Kyoto" by Phoebe Bridgers
 "Kyoto" by Skrillex
 "Kyoto Song"  by The Cure
 "Move On" by David Bowie

Nagasaki
 "Nagasaki Wa Kyou Mo Ame Datta (長崎は今日も雨だった)" by Hiroshi Uchiyamada and Cool Five
 "Nagasaki (Ναγκασάκι)" by Tzimis Panousis
 "Nagasaki" by Harry Warren and Mort Dixon
 "Nagasaki Nightmare" by Crass

Nara
 "Arrival in Nara" by Alt-J
 "Leaving Nara" by Alt-J
 "Nara" by Alt-J

Tokyo

Yokohama
 "Blue Light Yokohama" by Ayumi Ishida

Kenya

Mombasa
 "Roland the Headless Thompson Gunner" by Warren Zevon
 "African Night Flight" by David Bowie

Kosovo

Pristina
 "Welcome to Prishtina" by Adrian Gaxha

Latvia

Riga
 "Dziesmiņa Rīgai" by Raimonds Pauls
 "Riga (Freedom)" by The Millions

Lebanon

Beirut
 "Beirut" by Peter Sarstedt
 "Beirut Aam Tebki" by Assi El Hallani
 "Beyrouth" by Isabelle Aubret
 "Beyrouth" by Enrico Macias
 "Beyrouth" by Ibrahim Maalouf
 "Honeymoon in Beirut" by Rick Springfield
 "Le Beirut" by Fairuz
 "Ya Beirut" by Magida El Roumi
 "Ya Hawa Beirut" by Fairuz

Liechtenstein

Vaduz
 "Vaduz" by

Luxemburg

Luxemburg
 "Sind Sie der Graf von Luxemburg" by Dorthe Kollo

Mesopotamia

Babylon
 "Drunk in Babylon" by The Saints
 "Rivers of Babylon" by The Melodians, Boney M.

Mexico

Acapulco
 "Acapulco" by Luis Mariano
 "Amor Eterno" by Rocío Dúrcal/Juan Gabriel
 "Fun in Acapulco" by Elvis Presley
 "Loco in Acapulco" by The Four Tops
 "You Can't Say No in Acapulco" by Elvis Presley
 "Planta" by Soda Stereo

Atotonilco
 "Atotonilco" by Angélica María

Culiacán
 "Culiacán Sinaloa" by Chalino Sánchez
 "Un Fin de Semana en Culiacán" by Espinoza Paz

Guadalajara
 "¡Ay, Jalisco, no te rajes!", ranchera song composed by Manuel Esperón with lyrics by Ernesto Cortázar Sr.

Juarez
 "Corrido de Ciudad Juárez" by Francisco "Charro" Avitia
 "¡Arriba Juárez!" by Juan Gabriel
 "La frontera" by Juan Gabriel
 "Juárez es el #1" by Juan Gabriel
 "Juarez" by Tori Amos

Mexico City
 "Sábado Distrito Federal" by Chava Flores
 "Mexico City" by Jolie Holland
 "Mi Distrito Federal" by Los Tigres del Norte
 "Vieja ciudad de hierro" by Rockdrigo González
 "Distrito Federal" by Los Auténticos Decadentes

Sinaloa
 "El Sinaloense" by Pedro Infante

Tampico
 "Tampico" by June Christy
 "Tampico Trauma" by Jimmy Buffett
 "Einmal in Tampico" (Peter Moesser / Lotar Olias) by Freddy Quinn
 "Tampico" by Eddie Meduza
 "Tampico Twist" (Franny Beecher) by Bill Haley & His Comets
 "Tampico hermoso", written by Samuel Margarito Lozano and made popular by Antonio Aguilar
 "En Tampico está lloviendo" by Lydia Mendoza
 "Beguine Tampico" by Tony Mottola
 "La conocí en Tampico" (Montes) by Pepe Marchena
 "Tampico" (Adolf von Kleebsattel) by Heino

Tijuana
 "Born in East L.A." by Cheech Marin
 "The Tijuana Jail" by Kingston Trio
 "Tijuana Lady" by Gomez
 "Tijuana Makes Me Happy" by Nortec Collective
 "Tijuana Sound Machine" by Nortec Collective
 "Welcome to Tijuana" by Manu Chao

Veracruz
 "Veracruz" by Agustín Lara

Moldova

Bălți
 "Belz, Mayn Shtetele" by Jacob Jacobs and Alexander Olshanetsky

Morocco

Marrakesh
 "Going to Marrakesh" by The Extra Lens
 "Marrakesh Express" by Crosby, Stills & Nash
 "Marrakesh Night Market" by Loreena McKennitt

Casablanca
 "Casablanca" by Nessbeal ft Cheba Maria

Tanger
 "Un automne à Tanger" by Hubert-Félix Thiéfaine
 "Tangier" by Donovan

Agadir
 "Ride to Agadir" by Mike Batt

Nepal

Kathmandu
 "Katmandu" by Bob Seger
 "Katmandu" by Cat Stevens
 "Kathmandu" by Huub van der Lubbe
 "Kathmandu Dub" by Mad Professor

Netherlands

Amsterdam

Delfzijl
 "De Hoaven van Delfziel" by Ede Staal

The Hague
 "Arm Den Haag" by Wieteke van Dort
 "In Den Haag Is Een Laan" by Conny Vandenbos
 "Wat Voor Weer Zou Het Zijn In Den Haag?" by Conny Stuart
 "O O Den Haag" by Harry Klorkestein

Eindhoven 
 "Eindhoven" by Kempi

Maassluis 
 "Maassluis" by The Amazing Stroopwafels

Nieuwegein
 "Herfst in Nieuwegein"  by Spinvis

Nijmegen
 "Nijmegen bij Zonsondergang" by Frank Boeijen
 "Nijmegen deur my trane" by Gert Vlok Nel
 "Kronenburg Park" by Frank Boeijen

Rotterdam
 "Ben je in Rotterdam geboren" by Gerard Cox
 "De Reus van Rotterdam" by The Amazing Stroopwafels
 "Dijklied" by Drs. P
 "Keileweg" by The Amazing Stroopwafels
 "Oude Maasweg" by The Amazing Stroopwafels
 "Rotterdam, de mooiste rotstad die er is" by Hermes House Band
 "Rotterdam éch wel!" by Euromasters
 "Rotterdam or Anywhere" by The Beautiful South
 "Rotterdam" by Léo Ferré
 "Rotterdam Zuid" by The Amazing Stroopwafels
 "Vakantie in Overschie" by The Amazing Stroopwafels

Tilburg
 "Tilburg" by Guus Meeuwis

Sneek
 "Cafeetje in Sneek" by Drs. P

Utrecht
 "Weg van Utrecht" by Het Goede Doel, Herman van Veen and Spinvis
 "(Ode aan) Utrecht" by Claudia de Breij

Zwolle
 "Verre Oosten" by Opgezwolle
 "Zwolle zonder Dollen" by Van Kooten en de Bie

Zoutelande 
 ''Zoutelande'' by BLØF

Amersfoort
 "De Dominee Van Amersfoort" by Boudewijn de Groot

New Zealand

Auckland
 "Dominion Road" by The Mutton Birds
 "Holiday in Auckland" by Mental As Anything

Hastings
 "Waimarama" by Franck Monnet

Wellington
 "Murder on Manners Street" by The Mockers
 "Wellington" by The Mutton Birds

Nicaragua

Managua
 "Managua, linda Managua" by Otto de la Rocha

Nigeria

Lagos
 "Lagos vs New York" by Keziah Jones
 "Lagos Jump" by Third World

North Korea

Pyongyang
 "Pyongyang" by Blur

Norway

Oslo

Pakistan

Lahore
 "Lahore Lahore Aye" by Tariq Tafu
 "Lahore to Longsight" by Aziz Ibrahim
 "Lahore" by Guru Randhawa

Panama
 "La Murga de Panama" by Héctor Lavoe
 "Oye" by Rubén Blades

Peru

Lima
 "Bienvenue chez les nus" by Indochine
 "Lima de Novia" by Lucha Reyes
 "Chabuca Limeña" by Raphael
 "Rosa de Lima" by Joaquín Sabina

Philippines

Manila

Poland

Bydgoszcz
 "Bydgoszcz jedyne miasto" by Irena Santor
 "Depesza z miasta B" by Roan

Gdańsk
 "Gdansk" by Test Dept
 "Sztany glany" by Kury
 "Zawsze Gdańsk" by Big Cyc

Gdynia
 "Gdynia nocą" by Apteka
 "Sztany glany" by Kury

Kraków
 "Blayb gezunt mir, Kroke" by Mordechai Gebirtig
 "Bracka" by Grzegorz Turnau
 "Krakofsky" by Happysad
 "Krakow" by Static Icon
 "Krakowski spleen" by Maanam
 "Kraków" by Marek Grechuta & Myslovitz
 "Kraków (Ocean wolnego czasu)" by Maanam
 "Miasto Kraków" by Homo Twist
 "Walczyk o Krakowie" by Sztywny Pal Azji

Łódź
 "Bałuty" by O.S.T.R.
 "Deszczowa piosenka" by Coma
 "Łódzka" by Artur Andrus
 "Łódź by Night" by Beltaine
 "Reprezentuj" by O.S.T.R.
 "Tabasko" by O.S.T.R.
 "Theo wir fahr'n nach Lodz" by Vicky Leandros
 "Uciekaj" by Cool Kids of Death

Piła
 "Piła tango" by Strachy na Lachy

Poznań
 "Ezoteryczny Poznań" by Pidżama Porno
 "Miasto doznań" by Muchy

Rybnik
 "Karliku, Karliku" by traditional folk song.

Sopot
 "Sopot" by Ścianka
 "Sztany glany" by Kury

Szczecin
 "Szczecin" by The Analogs

Warsaw
 "Kamienne schodki" by Irena Santor & Kasia Stankiewicz
 "Les remparts de Varsovie" by Jacques Brel
 "Les Tzars" by Indochine
 "Na Francuskiej" by Rena Rolska
 "Nie masz cwaniaka nad warszawiaka" by Stanisław Grzesiuk
 "Piosenka o mojej Warszawie" by Mieczysław Fogg
 "Radio Warszawa" by Sidney Polak feat. Pezet
 "Sen o Warszawie" by Czesław Niemen
 "Stacja Warszawa" by Lady Pank
 "Sypka Warszawa" by Anna Maria Jopek
 "Taka Warszawa" by Beata Kozidrak
 "Tango Warszawo" by Stanisław Soyka & Agnieszka Osiecka
 "Telehon" by Pablopavo
 "Varsovie" by Brodka
 "Vava To" by Vavamuffin
 "Walczyk Warszawy" by Irena Santor
 "Warsaw" by Joy Division
 "Warsaw" by Rancid
 "Warsaw" by Sharon Van Etten
 "Warszawa" by David Bowie
 "Warszawa" by T.Love
 "Warszawa da się lubić" by Adolf Dymsza
 "Warszawo ma" by Zofia Mrozowska

Wrocław
 "Nadzieja o Wrocławiu" by Lech Janerka
 "Wrocławska Piosenka" by Maria Koterbska

Portugal

Cascais
 "Baía de Cascais" by Delfins

Coimbra
 "Coimbra" by Amália Rodrigues
 "Coimbra Menina e Moça (Fado de Coimbra)" by Edmundo Bettencourt
 "Saudades de Coimbra" by José Afonso
 "Vira de Coimbra" by José Afonso
 "Do Choupal Até Á Lapa" by José Afonso
 "Balada da Despedida (Coimbra Tem Mais Encanto)" by Fernando Machado Soares

Lisbon
 "Cheira bem, cheira a Lisboa" by Amália Rodrigues
 "Lisboa, Menina e Moça" by Carlos do Carmo
 "Lisbon" by Angra
 "Lisbon" by The Walkmen
 "Lisbon" by Wolf Alice
 "No Reason To Cry" by The Go-Betweens
 "Que fazes aí, Lisboa?", sung by fado singers like Mísia or Amália Rodrigues
 "Lisbonne" by Lilicub
 "Fado Lisboeta" by Amália Rodrigues
 "Lisbonne" by Charles Aznavour
 "Lisboa Antiga" by Amália Rodrigues
 "Madrugada de Alfama" by Amália Rodrigues
 "Lisboa" by Melody Gardot
 "Lisboa à Noite" by Amália Rodrigues
 "Esta Lisboa que eu amo" by Simone de Oliveira
 "Lisboa Não Sejas Francesa" by Amália Rodrigues
 "Maria Lisboa" by Amália Rodrigues
 "Canoas do Tejo" by Carlos do Carmo
 "Bairro Alto" by Carlos do Carmo
 "Teu nome Lisboa" by Carlos do Carmo
 "Marcha de Alfama" by Amália Rodrigues
 "Alfama" by Madredeus
 "Moro em Lisboa" by Madredeus
 "Nome de Rua" by Amália Rodrigues
 "Marcha do Centenário (Lisboa Nasceu)" by Amália Rodrigues
 "La vai Lisboa" by Amália Rodrigues
 "Lisboa dos Manjericos" by Amália Rodrigues
 "Lisboa dos Milagres" by Amália Rodrigues
 "Menina Lisboa" by Amália Rodrigues
 "Grande marcha de Lisboa" by Amália Rodrigues
 "Marcha da Mouraria" by Amália Rodrigues
 "Ai Mouraria" by Amália Rodrigues
 "Olha a Marcha de Benfica" by Amália Rodrigues
 "Noite de Santo António" by Amália Rodrigues
 "Lisboa Oxalá" by Carlos do Carmo e Carminho
 "Sempre Que Lisboa Canta" by Carlos do Carmo
 "A Luz de Lisboa (Claridade)" by Camané
 "É Lisboa a Namorar" by Cuca Roseta
 "Canção De Lisboa" by Fernando Farinha
 "O Fado Mora Em Lisboa" by Tony de Matos
 "Lisboa no Coraçao" by Joana Amendoeira
 "Lisboa e o Tejo" by Marina Mota
 "Ouve Lisboa" by Adélia Pedrosa
 "Lisboa que amanhece" by Sérgio Godinho e Caetano Veloso
 "Lisboa Velha Amiga" by Vera Mónica
 "Há Festa na Mouraria" by Alfredo Marceneiro

Peniche
 "Abandono" (Fado de Peniche) by Amália Rodrigues

Porto
 "Porto" by Worakls
 "Marcha São João do Porto" by Amália Rodrigues
 "Meus Olhos Que Por Alguém (Fado Menor Do Porto)" by Mariza
 "Menino do Bairro Negro" by Zeca Afonso
 "Porto Sentido" by Rui Veloso

Puerto Rico

San Juan
 "En San Juan Me Enamore" by Menudo
 "La Perla" by Calle 13

Romania

Bucharest 
 "București" by La Familia
 "București" by Gabi Luncă
 "București, București" by Gică Petrescu
 "Bucurest(בוקרשט)" by Omer Adam

Timișoara
 "Timișoara" by Transsylvania Phoenix

Medgidia
 "Vin la noi la Medgidia" by Dan Spătaru

Russia

Moscow

Saint Petersburg
 "Saint-Pétersbourg" by Desireless
 "Leningrad" by Billy Joel
 "St. Petersburg" by Supergrass

Rwanda

Gisenyi
 "Irungu" by Mani Martin

Kigali
 "Inkera" by Miss Shanel
 "Rwanda" by Miss Shanel

Senegal

Mbignona
 "Jammu Africa" by Ismaël Lô

Serbia

Belgrade
 "Ruža vetrova" by Bajaga i instruktori
 "Gdje Dunav ljubi nebo" by Josipa Lisac
 "Stranac" by Drago Mlinarec
 "Beograd" by Ceca

South Africa

Cape Town
 Mentioned in "Lisa se Klavier" by Koos Kombuis later covered by Laurika Rauch, Parlotones, Dozi and Wasserfall
 "Palm Sunday (On Board The S.S. Within)" by The Go-Betweens
 "Cape Town" by The Young Veins

Durban
 "Durban Deep" by Elton John
 "Durban Poison" by Graham Parker
 "Durban Skies" by Bastille

Johannesburg
 "Gimme Hope Jo'anna" by Eddy Grant
 "Johannesburg" by Gil Scott-Heron
 Mentioned in Oliver's Army by Elvis Costello
 "Meadowlands" (township of Johannesburg) by Strike Vilikazi, covered by Archie Coker & the Meteors and later by Richard Jon Smith, Ratau Mike Makhalemele and The Gugulethu Tenors.

Margate
 "Trein na Margate" by Steve Hofmeyr

Port Elizabeth
 "Biko" by Peter Gabriel

Pretoria
 "Trein na Pretoria" versions by Stefan Lubbe, Die Briels, Die Grafsteen Sangers, Dozi, Peter Senekal.
 "We are marching to Pretoria" (traditional)

Soweto
 "A Song for Soweto" by June Jordan
 "Soweto Blues" by Miriam Makeba
 "Soweto Dawn" by Ratau Mike Makhalemele
 "Zondag in Soweto" by Stef Bos

Pretoria/Tshwane
 "Mamelodi" (a Township in Pretoria) by Larry Joe featuring Vusi Mahlasela

South Korea

Seoul
 "Seoul" by Lee Yong
 "Seoul, Seoul, Seoul" by Cho Yong-pil
 "Seoul 1987" by Cho Yong-pil
 "Seoului changa" (literally, "Song in praise of Seoul") by Patti Kim
 "Seoul" by Girls Generation and Super Junior
 "Gangnam Style" by Psy
 "Seoul" by BTS

Busan
 Dorawayo Busan Hang E (돌아와요 부산항에) sung by Cho Yong Pil

Spain

Almería
 "Almería Tierra Noble" by David Bisbal
 "Viva Almería" by Manolo Escobar, in his disc Contemporáneo

Barcelona

Bilbao
 "Bilbao song" by Kurt Weill & Bertolt Brecht

Cádiz
 "Cadiz" by Hugh Cornwell
 "Cai", sung by Niña Pastori, written by Alejandro Sanz
 "La Belle de Cadix" by Luis Mariano

Córdoba
 "Córdoba" by Medina Azahara
 "Cordoba" by Brian Eno and John Cale

Granada
 "Granada" written by Agustín Lara
 "Vuelvo a Granada" by Miguel Ríos

Huelva
 "Huelva" by Ecos del Rocío

Málaga
 "Málaga" by Ecos del Rocío
 "Málaga" by Medina Azahara
 "Málaga" by Fred Bongusto
 "Málaga" by Girls Names
 "Malagueña Salerosa" by Chingon

Madrid
 "Aquí no hay playa" by The Refrescos
 "Arde Madrid" by Mikel Erentxun
 "Así es Madrid" by Medina Azahara
 "Bailando por ahí" by Juan Magán
 "Calles de Madrid" by Quique González
 "El cielo de Madrid" by Deluxe
 "El Pichi " or "Pichi", music by Francisco Alonso with lyrics by Emilio González and José Muñoz, sung by Celia Gámez among others.
 "En las calles de Madrid" by Rosana
 "Il neige sur Madrid" by Nicolas Peyrac
 "La Puerta de Alcalá " by Ana Belén and Víctor Manuel
 "Los nardos" or "Por la calle de Alcalá", music by Francisco Alonso with lyrics by Emilio González and José Muñoz, sung by Celia Gámez among others.
 "Km. 0" by Ismael Serrano
 "Lady Madrid" by Pereza
 "Madrid" by Pereza
 "Madrid" by Thalía
 "Madrid" by Amaral
 "Madrid" by Dover
 "Madrid" by El Canto del Loco
 "Madrid" by Holden
 "Madrid" by Burning
 "Madrid, Madrid" by Hombres G
 "Madrid, Madrid" by Nilda Fernández
 "Madrid, Madrid, Madrid", Schottische by Agustín Lara
 "Madrid-Memphis" by Javier Vargas
 "Musica notturna delle strade di Madrid" by Luigi Boccherini
 "Pasa el otoño" by Antonio Vega
 "Pongamos que hablo de Madrid" by Joaquín Sabina
 "Quédate en Madrid" by Mecano
 "Puedes contar conmigo" by La Oreja de Van Gogh
 "Rosa de Madrid", "Schottische", lyrics by José Soriano, music by Luis Barta sung by Concha Piquer, Sara Montiel and Lilian de Celis among others.
 "Te dejo Madrid" by Shakira
 "Tu mirada me hace grande" by Maldita Nerea
 "Vente pa´Madrid" by Ketama
 "Yo me bajo en Atocha" by Joaquín Sabina

Murcia
 "Murcia" by Agustín Lara

Salamanca
 "Mi Salamanca" by Rafael Farina

San Fernando, Cádiz
 "A San Fernando, un ratito a pie y otro caminando" by Manolo García

San Sebastián
 "La Playa" by La Oreja de Van Gogh, dedicated to the Beach of La Concha

Santiago de Compostela
 "Chove en Santiago" by Luar na Lubre, lyrics by Federico García Lorca

Seville
 "Sevilla" by Miguel Bosé
 "Sevilla" by Ecos del Rocío
 "Sevilla perfumada de naranjos" by Juan María Solare
 "Sevilla tiene un color especial" by Los del Río

Soria
 "Camino Soria" by Gabinete Caligari

Toledo
 "Toledo" by Agustín Lara

Torremolinos
 "Torremolinos" by Sttellla

Valencia
 "Valencia" by Agustín Lara
 "Valencia", pasodoble song by José Padilla, sung by Luis Mariano, Mistinguett and Tony Martin among others
 "Valencia" by Josh Rouse

Valladolid
 "Valladolid, Buenos Días" by El Niño Gusano

Sweden

Stockholm

Gothenburg
 "Känn ingen sorg för mig Göteborg" by Håkan Hellström
 "Kalendervägen 113.D" by Jens Lekman

Uppsala
 "Ein Student aus Uppsala" by Kirsti Sparboe
 "Välkommen  hem" by Labyrint

Switzerland

Bern
 "Dynamit" by Mani Matter
 "W. Nuss vo Bümpliz" by Patent Ochsner

Montreux
 "Smoke on the Water" by Deep Purple

Wallisellen
 "Wallisellen" by Stiller Has

Tanzania

Zanzibar
 "Uniguse" by Miss Shanel
 "Zanzibar" by Sérgio Mendes & The New Brasil '77

Tajikistan

Dushanbe
 "Dushanbe" by Aida Vedishcheva
 "Song about Dushanbe" by Vladimir Troshin, written by Alexander Zatsepin

Thailand

Bangkok
 "A Passage to Bangkok" by Rush
 "Bangkok" by Alex Chilton
 "Bangkok City" by Orange Caramel
 "Houndog" by Cold Chisel
 "I Will Follow You into the Dark" by Death Cab for Cutie
 "One Night in Bangkok" by Murray Head
 "Roma-Bangkok" by Baby K
 "Bangkok" by Destroyer
 "กรุงเทพมหานคร" (Krung Thep Maha Nakhon) by อัสนี-วสันต์ (Asanee–Wasan). Its lyrics are the ceremonial name of Bangkok
 "Woke up in Bangkok" by Deepend & YouNotUs ft. Martin Gallop

Chiang Mai
 "Above Chiangmai" by Harold Budd & Brian Eno
 "បុបា្ផឈាងម៉ៃ" (Bopha Chiang mai, บุปผาเชียงใหม่) by ស៊ិន ស៊ីសាមុត (Sinn Sisamouth, สิน ศรีสมุทร)

Chonburi
 "Pattaya" by Rim'K
 "Pattaya" by Katastrofe

Tunisia

Tunis
 "Au Café des délices" by Patrick Bruel

Turkey

Ankara
 "Ankara" by Vega
 "Ankara'da Aşık Olmak" by Zuhal Olcay

Bodrum
 "Bodrum" by MFÖ
 "Bodrum" by Hande Yener

Gaziantep
 "Gaziantep Yolunda" by Cem Adrian

Istanbul
 "Sensiz İstanbul'a Düşmanım" by Gripin
 "İstanbul İstanbul Olalı" by Sezen Aksu
 "İstanbul Hatırası" by Sezen Aksu
  "İstanbul'da Sonbahar" by Teoman
 "Yarim İstanbul" by Levent Yüksel
 "İstanbul" by Duman
 "Bu Sabah Yağmur var İstanbul'da" by MFÖ
 "İstanbul" by Sertab Erener
 "İstanbul" by Pamela Spence
 "İstanbul" by Ezginin Günlüğü
 "Kadıköy" by Ezginin Günlüğü
 "İstanbul Ağlıyor" by Tarkan
 "Aziz İstanbul" by Münir Nurettin Selçuk
 "Kalamış" by Münir Nurettin Selçuk
 "Kız Sen İstanbul'un Neresindensin" by Emel Sayın
 "Biz Heybeli'de Her Gece" by Emel Sayın
 "Beyoğlu'nda Gezersin" by Athena
 "Ceviz Ağacı" by Cem Karaca
 "Bir Garip Orhan Veli" by Muazzez Abacı
 "Bu Sabah Yağmur Var İstanbul'da" by MFÖ
 "Istanbul (Not Constantinople)" by The Four Lads, They Might Be Giants
 "C-O-N-S-T-A-N-T-I-N-O-P-L-E" by Paul Whiteman
 "Istanbul" by Morrissey
 "Istanbul" by Caterina Valente
 "Our Man In Istanbul" by Steve Stevens
 "Telephone Call From Istanbul" by Tom Waits
 "The Gates of Istanbul" by Loreena McKennitt
 "Istanbul" by Bosse
 "Istanbul" by Milica Pavlović
 "Istanbul" by Marc Aryan
 "Istanbul" by Darío Moreno
 "Bisanzio" by Francesco Guccini
 "Istanblues" by Juan María Solare

Izmir
 "İzmir'in Kızları" by Sezen Aksu
 "İzmir Yanıyor" by Sezen Aksu

Ukraine

Kiev
 "Kiev" by Barclay James Harvest
 "Kiev-Moscow" by NuAngels
 "Kiev" by Renaissance
 "Kyiv" by Tom Misch and Yussef Dayes

Odessa
 "Odessa (City on the Black Sea)" by Bee Gees
 "Auf dem Wege nach Odessa" by Alexandra

United Arab Emirates

Abu Dhabi
 "Abu Dhabi" by Split Enz

United Kingdom

Aberdeen
 "The Northern Lights of Old Aberdeen" originally by Mary Webb and covered by Jimmy Shand and The Alexander Brothers – sung by fans of Aberdeen F.C.
 "Aberdeen" by Cage The Elephant - written whilst on tour by the band's singer Matt Schultz when he could not stop singing the city's name.

Arun
 "An Old Cottage in Arun" by Juan María Solare

Belfast
 "Alternative Ulster" by Stiff Little Fingers
 "Ulster" by Sham 69
 "Belfast" by Boney M
 "Belfast" by Elton John
 "Belfast" by Neon Neon
 "Belfast" by Orbital
 "Belfast Child" by Simple Minds
 "Cyprus Avenue" by Van Morrisson 
 "Northern Industrial Town" by Billy Bragg
 "Soldier" by Harvey Andrews
 "The Boys Of Belfast" by The Irish Rovers

Birmingham

Bradford
 "Back to Bradford" by Smokie

Brighton
 "Rumble in Brighton" by Stray Cats
 "Brighton Rock" by Queen
 "You're Not from Brighton" by Fatboy Slim
 "Brighton Bomb" by Angelic Upstarts
 "From Brighton Beach to Santa Monica" by The Clientele
 "Cool Breeze of Brighton" by Tangerine Dream
 "La Baigneuse de Brighton" by Jane Birkin
 "Red Skies Over Paradise (A Brighton Dream)" by Fischer-Z
 "5:15" by The Who
 "Waiting for Changes" by Feeder
 "By the Sea" by Morcheeba
 "This Is The Sea" by The Waterboys
 "Last Bongo in Brighton remix" by DJ Format
 "Pinball Wizard" by The Who
 "Not The One" by Al Stewart
 "Waiting for the 7.18" by Bloc Party

Coventry
 "Ghost Town" by The Specials

Dover
 "Dover–Calais" by Style
 "Cliffs of Dover" by Eric Johnson

Edinburgh
 "Edinburgh Man" by The Fall
 "Streets of Edinburgh" by The Proclaimers
 "Sunshine on Leith" by The Proclaimers

Glasgow
 "Feather On the Clyde" by Passenger
 "I Belong To Glasgow" by Will Fyffe
 "Nothing Ever Happens" by Del Amitri
 "Glasgow" by Catfish and the Bottlemen
 "Super Trouper" by ABBA
 "Tinseltown in the Rain" by The Blue Nile
 "Glasgow Kiss" by John Petrucci

Ipswich
 "Erbie Fitch's Twitch" Toni award winning song from the 1959 musical, Redhead most famously performed by Gwen Verdon

Kilmarnock
 "Joyful Kilmarnock Blues" by The Proclaimers

Leeds
 "I Predict A Riot" by Kaiser Chiefs
 Fallout by Catfish and the Bottlemen

Liverpool

London

Derry
 "Sunrise" by Divine Comedy
 "The town I loved so well" by Phil Coulter

Manchester

Newcastle upon Tyne
 "Blaydon Races" by George "Geordie" Ridley

Newport
 "Newport (Ymerodraeth State of Mind)" by M-J Delaney
 "You're Not From Newport" by Goldie Lookin Chain

Nottingham
 "Not in Nottingham" by Roger Miller

Salford
 "Dirty Old Town" by Ewan MacColl, covered by The Dubliners and The Pogues
 "Salford Sunday" by Richard Thompson
 "Shadows of Salford" by Doves

Sheffield
 "Coles Corner" by Richard Hawley
 "Sheffield:Sex City" by Pulp
 "Wickerman" by Pulp

Southampton
 "The Ballad of John and Yoko" by The Beatles

Three Bridges
 "Three Bridges" by Juan María Solare

Wakefield
 "I've Tried Everything" by The Cribs

United States

Aberdeen, Maryland
 "I-95" by Fountains of Wayne

Abilene, Kansas
 "Abilene" by George Hamilton IV
 "Loser" by Grateful Dead

Akron, Ohio
 "Downtown (Akron)" by The Pretenders
 "My City Was Gone" by The Pretenders

Albuquerque, New Mexico
 "Albuquerque" by Neil Young
 "Albuquerque" by Sons of the Desert
 "Albuquerque" by "Weird Al" Yankovic
 "Alburquerque (Wild Scenes)" by The Psychotic Turnbuckles
 "Blue Bedroom" Toby Keith
 "Bring Em Out" by T.I.
 "By the Time I Get to Phoenix" Frank Sinatra, Glen Campbell, Dean Martin, Roger Miller, Engelbert Humperdinck, Johnny Rivers
 "Cowboy Movie" David Crosby
 "(Get Your Kicks on) Route 66" Perry Como
 "I Hope Your Whole Life Sux" Blackbear
 "Make it Clap" Busta Rhymes
 "Space Between Us" Sister Hazel
 "The King of Rock 'n' Roll" by Prefab Sprout
 "Point Me in the Direction of Albuquerque" by Tony Romeo
 "The Promised Land" Chuck Berry
 "Train Kept A Rollin'" Stray Cats
 "Wanted Man" Johnny Cash, Bob Dylan, Nick Cave

Allentown, Pennsylvania
 "Allentown" by Billy Joel
 "Allentown Jail" by Kingston Trio

Amarillo, Texas
 "Amarillo" by Gorillaz
 "Amarillo" by Emmylou Harris
 "Amarillo by Morning" by George Strait
 "Amarillo Sky" by Jason Aldean
 "If Hollywood Don't Need You (Honey I Still Do)" by Don Williams
 "Is This the Way to Amarillo" by Neil Sedaka and Howard Greenfield 
"(Get Your Kicks on)Route 66" by Bobby Troup

Ann Arbor, Michigan 
 "I Want to Go Back to Michigan" by Anonymous, popularized by University of Michigan Men's Glee Club
 "Last Parade on Ann Street" by Chris Bathgate

Anchorage, Alaska
 "Anchorage" by Michelle Shocked

Arlington, Virginia
 "Arlandria" by Foo Fighters
 "Arlington" by Trace Adkins

Atlanta, Georgia

Asbury Park, New Jersey
 "Fourth of July, Asbury Park (Sandy)" by Bruce Springsteen
 "My City of Ruins" by Bruce Springsteen

Atlantic City, New Jersey
 "Atlantic City" by Bruce Springsteen

Austin, Texas
 "Amy's Back In Austin" by Little Texas
 "Austin" by Blake Shelton
 "Austin in My Sights" by The Bluescasters
 "Austin to Ashes" by the Turnpike Troubadours

Avalon (Catalina Isl.), California
 "Avalon" by Lionel Hampton

Bad Axe, Michigan 
 "Bad Axe, Michigan" by Air Traffic Controller

Bakersfield, California
 "Bakersfield" by Social Distortion
 "Mexicali Blues" by Grateful Dead
 "Streets of Bakersfield" by Dwight Yoakam
 "Far Away Eyes" by Rolling Stones

Baltimore, Maryland
 "Baltimore" by The Extra Lens
 "Baltimore" by Lyle Lovett
 "Baltimore" by Mal Blum
 "Baltimore" by Prince
 "Baltimore" by Randy Newman, Nina Simone
 "Baltimore" by Sonny James
 "Baltimore's Fireflies" by Woodkid
 "Barefoot in Baltimore" by Strawberry Alarm Clock
 "Blue Skies Over Dundalk" by Mary Prankster
 "Engine Engine Number 9" by Roger Miller
 "For Baltimore" by All Time Low
 "The Girl From Baltimore" by The Fleshtones
 "Good Morning Baltimore" from Hairspray!
 "Heaven in Baltimore" by Dale Watson
 "Hungry Heart" by Bruce Springsteen
 "Moonlight Feels Right" by Starbuck
 "Raining in Baltimore" by Counting Crows
 "Streets of Baltimore" by Bobby Bare
 "Willie Jones" by the Charlie Daniels Band
 "Baltimore To Washington" by Woody Guthrie & Cisco Houston
 "The Lady Came from Baltimore" by Tim Hardin
 "The Star-Spangled Banner" by Francis Scott Key

Bangor, Maine
 "King Of The Road" by Roger Miller

Baton Rouge, Louisiana
 "Calling Baton Rouge" by Garth Brooks
 "Me and Bobby McGee"
 “Greenville to Baton Rouge” by Drive-by Truckers
 “Baton Rouge” by Guy Clark
 "Baton Rouge" by The Nixons

Baxter Springs, Kansas
 "Choctaw Bingo" by James McMurtry

Beaumont, Texas
 "Beaumont" by Hayes Carll
 "Pretty Little Lady From Beaumont, Texas" by George Jones
 "The Night's Too Long" by Patty Loveless

Birmingham, Alabama

Bossier City, Louisiana
 "Bossier City" by the Turnpike Troubadours

Boston, Massachusetts

Boulder, Colorado
 "Boulder to Birmingham" by Emmylou Harris

Brownsville, Texas
 "It's All Here in Brownsville" by The Mountain Goats

Buffalo, New York
 "Broadway" by The Goo Goo Dolls
 "Shuffle Off to Buffalo" by The Stolen Sweets
 "Truckin" by Grateful Dead
 "Ladies Night in Buffalo" by David Lee Roth
 "Rock and Roll Girls" by John Fogerty
 "Buffalo" by The Church

Cape May, New Jersey 
 "On the Way to Cape May"

Charleston, South Carolina
 "Carolina" by Corey Smith
 "Holy City" by Edwin McCain
 "The Charleston (dance) and song"
 "You Can Have Charleston" by Darius Rucker

Charleston, West Virginia
 “Charleston Girl” by Tyler Childers

Charlotte, North Carolina
 "Gridiron Fight" (about the Panthers) by Paper Tongues
 "In Charlotte" by Young Dolph
 "Brick" by Ben Folds Five
 “Charlotte's in North Carolina” by Keith Whitley

Chattanooga, Tennessee
 "The Chattanooga Shoot Shoot" by Darren Hanlon
 "Chattanooga Sugar Babe" by Johnny Cash
 "Chattanooga Choo Choo" by The Andrews Sisters, Glenn Miller
 “Chattanooga Lucy” by Eric Church

Cheyenne, Wyoming
 "I Can Still Make Cheyenne" by George Strait
 "Jack Straw" by Grateful Dead
 "The Beaches of Cheyenne" Garth Brooks
 “July in Cheyenne” by Aaron Watson

Chicago, Illinois

Cincinnati, Ohio
 "Comin' to Your City" by Big & Rich
 "Fins" by Jimmy Buffett
 "Jesus, Take the Wheel" by Carrie Underwood
 "Lights of Cincinnati" by Scott Walker

Cleveland, Ohio
 "Anything But Mine" by Kenny Chesney
 "Burn On" by Randy Newman
 "Christmas in Cleveland" by The Raveonettes
 "Cleveland" by Jewel
 "Cleveland is the City" by Bone Thugs-N-Harmony
 "Cleveland" by All-Time Quarterback
 "Cleveland" by Machine Gun Kelly
 "Cleveland is the Reason" by Kid Cudi
 "Cleveland Ohio Blues" by Bull Moose Jackson
 "Cleveland Rocks" by Ian Hunter
 "Cuyahoga" by REM
 "The Heart of Rock & Roll" by Huey Lewis and the News
 "East 1999" by Bone Thugs-N-Harmony
 "In the Heartland" by the Michael Stanley Band
 "Let's Get Wrecked" by honeyhoney
 "Let's Move to Cleveland" by Frank Zappa
 "Look Out, Cleveland" by The Band
 "Mean Night in Cleveland" by Cactus
 "Missing Cleveland" by Scott Weiland
 "My Town" by Michael Stanley Band
 "Ohio (Come Back to Texas)" by Bowling for Soup
 "Pancho and Lefty" by Townes Van Zandt, covered by Willie Nelson and Merle Haggard
 "Precious" by The Pretenders
 "Skinny Little Boy from Cleveland" by Alex Bevan
 "Stairway To Cleveland" by Jefferson Starship
 "Till I Die" by Machine Gun Kelly

Coeur d'Alene, Idaho
 "All I Left Behind" by Linda Ronstadt and Emmylou Harris
 "Coeur d'Alene" by The Head and the Heart
 "Coeur d'Alene" by Alter Bridge
 "Coeur d'Alene" by Tyson Motsenbocker

Columbus, Ohio
 "Road Outside Columbus" by O.A.R.

Commerce City, Colorado
 "Commerce City Sister" by DeVotchKa

Crescent City, California
 "Crescent City" by I'm with Her

Cripple Creek, Colorado
 "Up On Cripple Creek" by The Band
 "Cripple Creek Ferry" by Neil Young

Danville, Virginia
 "The Night They Drove Old Dixie Down" by The Band
 "The Wreck of the Old 97" by G. B. Grayson and Henry Whitter

Dallas, Texas
 "Big D" from The Most Happy Fella
 "Dallas" by Alan Jackson
 "Dallas" by The Flatlanders
 "Dallas" by Holly McNarland
 "Dallas" by Silver Jews
 "Dallas" by Johnny Winter
 "Dallas 1pm" by Saxon
 "Dallas After Midnight" by Ray Wylie Hubbard (with Jack Ingram)
 "Dallas Days and Fort Worth Nights" by Chris LeDoux
 "Goin Through The Big D" by Mark Chesnutt
 "He's in Dallas"- Reba McEntire
 "Hot Night in Dallas" by Moon Martin
 "I Drove Her To Dallas" by Ty England
 "People In Dallas Got Hair" by Waylon Jennings
 "Pecos Promenade" by Tanya Tucker
 "Run" by George Strait
 "Truckin'" by Grateful Dead
 "Trudy" by the Charlie Daniels Band
 "Willin'" by Little Feat

Decatur, Illinois
 "Decatur, or, Round of Applause for Your Stepmother!" by Sufjan Stevens

Denver, Colorado
 "40 Miles from Denver" by Yonder Mountain String Band
 "Denver" by Larry Gatlin & The Gatlin Brothers
 "Denver" by Willie Nelson
 "From Denver to L.A." by Elton John
 "Get Out of Denver" by Bob Seger
 "Me and My Uncle" by Grateful Dead
 "O.D.'d in Denver" by Hank Williams Jr.
 "Things to Do in Denver When You're Dead" by Warren Zevon

Des Moines, Iowa
 "Des Moines, Iowa" by The Milk Carton Kids

Detroit, Michigan

Doraville, Georgia
 "Doraville" by Atlanta Rhythm Section

El Paso, Texas
 "All The Way Down To El Paso" by Elton John
 "El Paso" by The Gourds
 "El Paso" by Marty Robbins
 "El Paso" by Old 97's
 "El Paso" by Taking Back Sunday
 "El Paso City" by Marty Robbins
 "Feleena (From El Paso)" by Marty Robbins
 "Texas Women" by Hank Williams Jr.

Eugene, Oregon
 "Eugene" by Sufjan Stevens
 "Eugene, Oregon" by Dolly Parton

Flagstaff, Arizona
 "Convoy" by C.W. McCall

Flint, Michigan
 "Flint (For the Unemployed and Underpaid)" by Sufjan Stevens

Folsom, California
 "Folsom Prison Blues" by Johnny Cash

Fort Lauderdale, Florida
 "Fort Lauderdale Chamber of Commerce" by Elvis Presley
 "All Signs Point to Lauderdale" by A Day to Remember

Fort Worth, Texas
 "Dallas Days and Fort Worth Nights" by Chris LeDoux
 "Does Fort Worth Ever Cross Your Mind" by George Strait
 "Fort Worth Blues" by Steve Earle

Gainesville, Florida
 "City of Gainesville" by Less Than Jake
 "Gainesville" by Tom Petty
 "Gainesville Rock City" by Less Than Jake

Galveston, Texas
 "Darling I Need You" by John Cale
 "Galveston" by Jimmy Webb
 "Pecos Promenade" by Tanya Tucker
 "Sylvia's Mother" by Dr. Hook & the Medicine Show

Garden Grove, California
 "Garden Grove" by Sublime, covered by Camper Van Beethoven
 "Home Again Garden Grove" by The Mountain Goats

Gary, Indiana
 "2300 Jackson Street" by The Jacksons
 "Gary, Indiana" from The Music Man

Gatlinburg, Tennessee
 "A Boy Named Sue" by Johnny Cash
 "Smoky Mountain Rain" by Ronnie Milsap

Greensboro, North Carolina
 "88 Seconds in Greensboro" by Orchestral Manoeuvres in the Dark

Hackensack, New Jersey
 "Hackensack" by Fountains of Wayne

Hoboken, New Jersey
 "Hoboken" by Operation Ivy

Holland, Michigan
 "Holland" by Sufjan Stevens

Honolulu, Hawaii
 "Honolulu City Lights" by Keola Beamer and Kapono Beamer
 "Honolulu Lulu" by Jan and Dean
 "She Let Herself Go" by George Strait

Highland, Illinois
 "Concerning the UFO Sighting near Highland, Illinois" by Sufjan Stevens

Houston, Texas
 "Amarillo by Morning" by George Strait
 "Bloody Mary Morning" by Willie Nelson
 "Dixie On My Mind" by Hank Williams Jr.
 "Dracula From Houston" by Butthole Surfers
 "Houston" by R.E.M.
 "Houston" by Lee Hazlewood
 "Houston" by Soul Coughing
 "Houston (Means I'm One Day Closer to You)" by Larry Gatlin & The Gatlin Brothers
 "Houston" by Dean Martin
 "Houston Heights" by Blue October
 "Midnight Special" by Lead Belly
 "Houston Town" by Buddy Ace
 "Telephone Road" by Rodney Crowell
 "Telephone Road" by Steve Earle
 "Truckin’" by Grateful Dead
 "Uneasy Rider '88" by the Charlie Daniels Band
 "Welcome 2 Houston" by Slim Thug and The Texas All Stars
 "Welcome to H-Town" by Lecrae ft. Dre Murray
 "Won't Let You Down Texas" by Chamillionaire

Indianapolis, Indiana
 "Indianapolis" by Menudo
 "Little Green Apples" sung by O.C. Smith
 "Mary Jane's Last Dance" by Tom Petty
 "Stuck in Indianapolis" by Bottle Rockets

Jackson, Mississippi
 "Halley Came to Jackson" by Mary Chapin Carpenter
 "Jackson" by Johnny Cash & June Carter, Nancy Sinatra & Lee Hazlewood
 "Jackson Ain't a Very Big Town" by Norma Jean
 "Jackson Mississippi" by Kid Rock
 "Uneasy Rider" by the Charlie Daniels Band

Jacksonville, Florida 
 "I'll Never Play Jacksonville Again" by Graham Parker
 "Indigo Flow" by Limp Bizkit
 "Ocean Avenue" by Yellowcard
 "The South's Gonna Do It" by The Charlie Daniels Band

Jacksonville, Illinois 
 "Jacksonville" by Sufjan Stevens

Jacksonville, North Carolina 
 "Jacksonville Skyline" by Whiskeytown
 “Jacksonville” by American Aquarium

Jersey City, New Jersey
 "Devil in Jersey City" by Coheed and Cambria
 "Jersey Bounce" by Tiny Bradshaw

Juneau, Alaska
 "Juneau" by Port Blue
 "Juneau" by Funeral for a Friend

Kalamazoo, Michigan
 "I've Got A Gal In Kalamazoo" by the Glenn Miller Orchestra
 "Gotta Get Away" by The Black Keys
 "Kalamazoo" by Primus
 "Kalamazoo" by Ben Folds

Kansas City, Missouri
 "18th Avenue (Kansas City Nightmare)" by Cat Stevens
 "Blues from Kansas City" by Jay McShann
 "K.C. Blues" by Charlie Parker
 "Kansas City" by Okkervil River
 "Kansas City" by The New Basement Tapes
 "Kansas City", from the musical Oklahoma!
 "Kansas City", performed by Wilbert Harrison
 "Kansas City" by Sneaky Sound System
 "Kansas City Bomber" by Phil Ochs
 "Kansas City Kitty" by Walter Donaldson
 "Kansas City Lights" by Steve Wariner
 "Kansas City Shuffle" by J. Ralph
 "Kansas City Shuffle (Intro)" by Tech N9ne
 "Kansas City Star"  by Roger Miller
 "Kansas Rock City" by Kiss
 "Liberty Street" by The New Basement Tapes
 "Six Months in Kansas City (Liberty Street)" by The New Basement Tapes
 "Train from Kansas City" by Neko Case
 "The Kansas City Song" by Buck Owens

Kent, Ohio
 "Ohio" by Crosby, Stills, Nash, & Young

Knoxville, Tennessee
 "Knoxville Girl" by Nick Cave
 "Knoxville Courthouse" by Hank Williams Jr.

La Grange, Texas
 "La Grange" by ZZ Top

Laramie, Wyoming
 "Lady from Laramie" by Burl Ives
 "Laramie" by Cymbals Eat Guitars
 "Laramie" by Geoff Love
 "Laramie" by Glenn Mercer
 "Laramie, Wyoming" by Richmond Fontaine
 "Lights of Laramie" by Ian Tyson
 "The Man From Laramie" by Al Martino
 "Somewhere West of Laramie" by Hank Cramer

Laredo, Texas
 "Laredo" by Band of Horses
 ”Laredo” by Chris Cagle
 "Me & Paul" by Willie Nelson
 "New Year's Day" by Charlie Robison
 "Streets of Laredo" (old cowboy song)
 "Laredo Tornado" by Electric Light Orchestra
 "The Devil Sent You To Laredo" by Baccara
 "Wheels of Laredo" by Tanya Tucker, The Highwomen

Las Vegas, Nevada
 "Alone in Vegas" by Pusha T
 "Checkout Time In Vegas" by Drive-By Truckers
 "Gone Country" by Alan Jackson
 "Heaven or Las Vegas" by Cocteau Twins
 "Las Vegas Nights" by Verona Grove
 "Leaving Las Vegas" by Sheryl Crow
 "Let's Go To Vegas" by Faith Hill
 "Vegas" by Sara Bareilles
 "Pretty Vegas" by INXS
 "Pyramids" by Frank Ocean
 "Sam's Town" by The Killers
 "She Let Herself Go" by George Strait
 "Vegas" by Calvin Harris
 "Vegas Lights" by Panic! At The Disco
 "Viva Las Vegas" by Elvis Presley
 "Waking Up in Vegas" by Katy Perry
 "Welcome to Fabulous Las Vegas" by Brandon Flowers
 “Ooh Las Vegas" by Gram Parsons

Laurel, Mississippi
 "Goin' Down to Laurel" by Steve Forbert

Lincoln, Nebraska
 "The Flight:Lincoln to Minneapolis " by Blue October

Little Rock, Arkansas
 "A Little Past Little Rock" by Lee Ann Womack
 "I Hear Little Rock Calling" by Ferlin Husky
 "Little Rock" by Collin Raye
 "Little Rock" by Reba McEntire
 "We're an American Band" by Grand Funk Railroad
 "Two Little Girls From Little Rock" by Marilyn Monroe

Lodi, California
 "Lodi" by Credence Clearwater Revival

Los Angeles, California

Louisville, Kentucky
 "Home Away from Home" by Pokey LaFarge
 "Flora" by Peter, Paul and Mary
 "Louisville K-Y" by Ella Fitzgerald
 "Louisville" by Amos Lee

Lubbock, Texas
 "Going to Lubbock" by The Extra Lens
 "Lubbock Or Leave It" by Dixie Chicks
 "Texas in my Rearview Mirror" by Mac Davis

Luckenbach, Texas
 "Luckenbach, Texas (Back to the Basics of Love)" by Waylon Jennings

Malibu, California
 "L.A. Boyz" by Victoria Justice and Ariana Grande
 "Malibu" by Hole
 "Malibu" by Kim Petras
 "Malibu" by Miley Cyrus
 "Malibu Gas Station" by Sonic Youth

Manti, Utah
 "The Town that Raised Me" by Mary Kaye

Marina del Rey, California
 "Marina del Rey" by George Strait

Marshalltown, Iowa 
 "Marshalltown" by Modern Life Is War

Memphis, Tennessee
Memphis holds the distinction of being the most mentioned city in the world when it comes to commercially recorded songs. As of July 2013, this list has made it up to 1074 songs and counting. The list is maintained at the Memphis Rock and Soul Museum website. The ones listed below are some of the better-known songs:
 "Black Velvet" by Alannah Myles
 "Candyman" by Grateful Dead
 "Considering A Move To Memphis" by The Colorblind James Experience
 "Crazed Country Rebel" by Hank Williams III
 "Graceland" by Paul Simon
 "Guitar Man" by Jerry Reed
 "Letter to Memphis" by Pixies
 "Maybe It Was Memphis" by Pam Tillis
 "Memphis" by Johnny Rivers
 "Memphis" by Marcy Playground
 "Memphis" by PJ Harvey
 "Memphis Beat" by Jerry Lee Lewis
 "Memphis Belle" by Hank Williams Jr.
 "Memphis Blues" by W. C. Handy
 "Memphis Skyline" by Rufus Wainwright
 "Memphis Soul Stew" by King Curtis
 "Memphis, Tennessee" by Chuck Berry
 "Messed Up In Memphis" by Darryl Worley
 "New Minglewood Blues" by Grateful Dead
 "Night Train to Memphis" by Roy Acuff
 "Nothing 'Bout Memphis" by Trisha Yearwood
 "Pride (In the Name of Love)" by U2
 "Queen of Memphis" by Confederate Railroad
 "Streets of West Memphis" by Crime & the City Solution
 "That's How I Got to Memphis" by Bobby Bare
 "The Golden Road (To Unlimited Devotion)" by Grateful Dead
 "Truck Drivin' Man" by Lynyrd Skynyrd
 "Walking in Memphis" by Marc Cohn
 "West Memphis" by Lucinda Williams
 "What's Your Mama's Name"  by Tanya Tucker
 "A White Suit in Memphis" by Simon Bonney
 "Wrong Side of Memphis" by Trisha Yearwood

Miami, Florida

Milwaukee, Wisconsin
 "Milwaukee Polka" by Frankie Yankovic
 "What Made Milwaukee Famous (Has Made a Loser Out of Me)" by Jerry Lee Lewis
 "Holocene" by Bon Iver
 "Milwaukee, Here I Come" by George Jones and Brenda Carter

Minneapolis, Minnesota
 "Always Coming Back Home to You" by Atmosphere
 "Christmas Card From a Hooker in Minneapolis" by Tom Waits
 "Lake Street is for Lovers" by Lifter Puller
 "Little Green Apples" sung by O.C. Smith
 "Mall of America" by Desaparecidos
 "Minneapolis" by that dog
 "Minneapolis" by Lucinda Williams
 "Minneapolis" by Bill Janovitz
 "MPLS Song" by Pinhead Gunpowder
 "Ninth and Hennepin" by Tom Waits
 "Positively Fourth Street" by Bob Dylan
 "Rock 'n' Roll is Alive (And it Lives in Minneapolis)" by Prince
 "Shhh"  by Atmosphere
 "Seeing Double at the Triple Rock" by NOFX
 "Skyway" by The Replacements
 "Southtown Girls" by The Hold Steady
 "Stuck Between Stations" by The Hold Steady
 "Sunshine" by Atmosphere
 "Uptown" by Prince
 "Your Little Hoodrat Friend" by The Hold Steady

Mobile, Alabama
 "Mobile" by the Mountain Goats
 "Stuck Inside of Mobile with the Memphis Blues Again" by Bob Dylan

Montgomery, Alabama
 "Midnight in Montgomery"  by Alan Jackson
 "Montgomery, Alabama" by David Yazbek
 "Montgomery in the Rain" by Hank Williams Jr.
 "The Ride"  by David Allan Coe
 "Tokyo Storm Warning" by Elvis Costello
 "200 More Miles" by Cowboy Junkies
 "Angel From Montgomery" by John Prine

Moscow, Idaho
 "Moscow, Idaho" by The Cassandra Complex

Muncie, Indiana
 "I Wanna Talk About Me" by Toby Keith

Muscle Shoals, Alabama
 "Sweet Home Alabama" by Lynyrd Skynyrd

Muskegon, Michigan
 "They Also Mourn Who Do Not Wear Black" by Sufjan Stevens

Muskogee, Oklahoma
 "Okie from Muskogee" by Merle Haggard

Myrtle Beach, South Carolina
 "Dancin', Shaggin' on the Boulevard" by Alabama
 "Ocean Boulevard" by Band of Oz
 "19 You + Me" by Dan + Shay
 "Myrtle Beach Summer 1974" by Yung Gravy

Nashville, Tennessee

New Orleans, Louisiana

New York City, New York

Olema, California
 "Hippie From Olema" by The Youngbloods

Oklahoma City, Oklahoma
"Oklahoma City" by Zach Bryan

Olympia, Washington
 "Rock Star" by Hole
 "Olympia WA." by Rancid

Omaha, Nebraska
 "Convoy" by C. W. McCall
 "Omaha" by Counting Crows
 "Omaha" by Waylon Jennings
 "(Ready or Not) Omaha Nebraska" by Bowling for Soup
 "Turn the Page" by Bob Seger
 "Uneasy Rider" by the Charlie Daniels Band
 "We're an American Band" by Grand Funk Railroad
 "Greater Omaha" by Desaparecidos

Palestine, Texas
 "Palestine, Texas" by T Bone Burnett

Panama City, Florida
 "Guitar Man" by Jerry Reed

Pasadena, California
 "The Little Old Lady (From Pasadena)" by Jan and Dean

Pensacola, Florida
 "Pensacola" by Deerhunter
 "Maybe Angels" by Sheryl Crow

Peoria, Illinois
 "Prairie Fire That Wanders About" by Sufjan Stevens

Philadelphia, Pennsylvania
 "I-76" by G. Love & Special Sauce
 "Bury me in Philly" by Dave Hause
 "Freedom of '76" by Ween
 "Fall in Philadelphia" by Hall & Oates
 "Goodbye Philadelphia" by Peter Cincotti
 "Is This America" by Skyhooks
 "Lancaster Avenue Blues" by Mischief Brew
 "Miss Philadelphia" by Musiq Soulchild
 "Motown Philly" by Boyz II Men
 "Philadelphia" by Neil Young
 "Philadelphia Freedom" by Elton John
 “Philly Forget Me Not” by Daryl Hall and John Oates
 "Punk Rock Girl" by The Dead Milkmen
 "Sailing to Philadelphia" by Mark Knopfler
 "Sit Down, John" from the musical 1776
 "Streets of Philadelphia" by Bruce Springsteen
 "Summertime" by DJ Jazzy Jeff & The Fresh Prince
 "Tenth Street" by Valencia
 "TSOP (The Sound of Philadelphia)" by MFSB
 "South Street" by The Orlons
 "Yo Home to Bel-Air" by DJ Jazzy Jeff & The Fresh Prince
 "You Got Me" by The Roots

Phoenix, Arizona
 "Anybody Going To San Antone" by Charley Pride
 "Arizona" by Scorpions
 "Bobby in Phoenix" by Gorillaz
 "By the Time I Get to Phoenix" by Jimmy Webb
 "Sunnyslope" by Fish Karma

Pittsburgh, Pennsylvania
 "31 (For Pittsburgh I Am Bound)" by Ceann
 "I'll Get by in Pittsburgh" by Jona Lewie
 "I'm in Pittsburgh" by The Outcasts
 "Ode to Pittsburgh" by Loudon Wainwright III
 "Pittsburgh" by Mary Lou Williams, featuring Leon Thomas
 "Pittsburgh Makes Me Drunk" by Ceann
 "Pittsburgh, Pennsylvania" by Guy Mitchell
 "Pittsburgh Sound (All In My Blood)" by Wiz Khalifa
 "Pittsburgh Town" by Pete Seeger
 "Six Days on the Road" by Dave Dudley

Pittsfield, Illinois
 "Pittsfield" by Sufjan Stevens

Portland, Maine
 "Nothing But Time" by Jackson Browne
 "Portland, Maine" by Tim McGraw
 "Portland Town" by Schooner Fare

Portland, Oregon

Raleigh, North Carolina
 "Red Eye to Raleigh" by Mipso
 "Wagon Wheel" by Old Crow Medicine Show

Reidsville, North Carolina
 “Reidsville” by American Aquarium

Reno, Nevada
 "Reno Bound" by Southern Pacific
 "Folsom Prison Blues" by Johnny Cash
 "Don't go Down to Reno" by Tony Christie
 "All the Way to Reno (You're Gonna Be a Star)" by R.E.M.
 "Friend of the Devil" by The Grateful Dead
 "Reno, Reno, Reno" by Jonathan Richman
 "Reno Blues" by Willie Dixon

Richmond, Virginia
 "Gibby" by Pat McGee Band
 "James River" by Cracker and Camper Van Beethoven
 "James River Blues" by Old Crow Medicine Show
 "Modern Day Bonnie and Clyde" by Travis Tritt
 "Richmond is a Hard Road" (Union Civil War song based on "Jordan is a Hard Road to Travel" by Dan Emmett)
 "Scuffle Town" by Avail
 "The Carolinian" by Chatham County Line
 "The Night They Drove Old Dixie Down" by The Band
 "Virginia Is For Lovers" by Mat Kearney
 "We Are Marching On To Richmond"  "Our knapsacks sling" (Union Civil War song) words and music by E.W. Locke

Riverside, California
 "Socal Thugsta" by Saint Dog

Roanoke, Virginia
 "Wagon Wheel" by Darius Rucker

Rocky Top, Tennessee
 "Rocky Top" by Osborne Brothers

Sacramento, California
 "Arco Arena" by CAKE
 "Sacramento" by Middle of the Road

Saginaw, Michigan
 "America" by Simon & Garfunkel
 "Saginaw, Michigan" by Lefty Frizzell

Saint Louis, Missouri
 "Born in St. Louis" by Pokey LaFarge
 "Country Grammer" by Nelly
 "Heavy Metal Drummer" by Wilco
 "Louis to Frisco" by Chuck Berry
 "Meet Me in St. Louis, Louis"
 "St. Louie" by Nelly
 "St Louis" by the Easybeats
 "Saint Louis Blues" by W. C. Handy
 "Saint Louis Rag" by Tom Turpin

Salinas, California
 "Me and Bobby McGee"

Salt Lake City, Utah
 "Salt Lake City" by The Beach Boys
"Salt Lake City" by The Dwarves
 "Salt Lake City" by Bob Weir

San Angelo, Texas
 "San Angelo" by Aaron Watson
 "San Angelo" by Marty Robbins
 "San Angelo" by Third Day

San Antonio, Texas
 "Across the Alley from the Alamo" by Bob Wills
 "Amarillo by Morning" by George Strait
 "Anybody Going To San Antone" by Charlie Pride
 "Folsom Prison Blues" by Johnny Cash
 "It Came from San Antonio" by Bruce Robison
 "Johnny Come Lately" by Steve Earle
 "New San Antonio Rose" by Bob Wills
 "Remember the Alamo" by George Strait
 "San Antonio" by Willie Nelson from Texas in My Soul
 "San Antonio Rose" by Lee Ann Womack, and Willie Nelson & Ray Price
 "San Antonio Nights" by Eddy Raven
 "San Antonio Romeo" by Tish Hinojosa
 "San Antonio Stroll" by Tanya Tucker
 "San Antonio, TX" by Frank Black and the Catholics
 "San Antone" by Whiskeytown
 "What am I Doing Hangin' 'Round?" by The Monkees

San Diego, California
 "Going to San Diego" by The Mountain Goats
 "San Diego" by Blink 182
 "San Diego" by Burning Brides
 "San Diego Serenade” by Tom Waits

San Francisco, California

San Jose, California
 "Do You Know The Way To San Jose?" by Burt Bacharach and Hal David

Santa Fe, New Mexico
 "Amarillo by Morning" by George Strait
 "Drive By" by Train
 "Santa Fe" by Bon Jovi
 "Santa Fe" by The Bellamy Brothers
 "Santa Fe" by The Bluescasters
 "Santa Fe" by Beirut
 "Santa Fe" from Newsies
 "Santa Fe" from Rent
 "Santa Fe" by Bob Dylan
 "Me and My Uncle" by Grateful Dead
 "Oblivion" Mudhoney
 "Gone to Santa Fe" David Wilcox
 "Hair of Gold, Eyes of Blue" Frank Sinatra
 "Coyote" Better Than Ezra
 "G.I. Five" Johnny Mercer
 "Lose That Girl" Saint Etienne
 "New Mexico's no Breeze" Iron & Wine
 "Midnight Train" Charlie Daniels Band

Sausalito, California
 "Sausalito Summer Night" by Diesel

Savannah, Georgia
 "The Moon over Georgia" by Shenandoah (band)
 "Savannah" by Relient K
 "West Savannah" by Outkast
 "Gump" by Weird Al Yankovic
 "Hard Hearted Hannah (The Vamp of Savannah)"
 "Savannah Nights" by Tom Johnston
 “Savannah Almost Killed Me” by American Aquarium

Seattle, Washington

Shreveport, Louisiana
 “Shreveport” Turnpike Troubadours

Simi Valley, California
 "Simi California" by Fisher

Sioux City, Iowa
 "Sioux City Sue" recorded by Gene Autry and others
 "Terminal Grain" by The Extra Lens

Springfield, Illinois
 "Springfield, or Bobby Got a Shadfly Caught in his Hair" by Sufjan Stevens
 "Springfield , mentioned in Get your Kicks on Route 66 " by Perry Como

St. Paul, Minnesota
 "Big River" by Johnny Cash
 "Leader of the Band" by Dan Fogelberg
 "Me and You and a Dog Named Boo" by Lobo
 "Mister D.J." by the Charlie Daniels Band

Statesboro, Georgia
 "Statesboro Blues" by The Allman Brothers Band

Tacoma, Washington
 "Rock'n Me" by Steve Miller Band
 "Thrice All-American" by Neko Case

Tallahassee, Florida
 "Tallahassee Lassie" by Freddy Cannon
 "Tallahassee" by The Mountain Goats
 "Tallahassee Tango" by Mephiskapheles

Telluride, Colorado
 "Telluride" by Tim McGraw

Thibodaux, Louisiana
 "Amos Moses" by Jerry Reed

Topeka, Kansas
 "Topeka" by Ludo

Tucson, Arizona
 "Closer" by The Chainsmokers
 "Get Back" by The Beatles
 "Goin' Back To Tucson" by The Supersuckers
 "Jack Straw" by Grateful Dead
 "Pray for Tucson" by Dave Hause
 "Send Me Down To Tucson" by Mel Tillis
 "Tucson" by Euphoria
 "Tucson Arizona" by Link Wray
 "Tucson, Arizona (Gazette)" by Dan Fogelberg
 "Tucson, Arizona" by Rory Gallagher
 "Tucson Train" by Bruce Springsteen
 "Willin'" by Little Feat

Tucumcari, New Mexico
 "Coyote" by Better Than Ezra
 "Dead End Diner" by Lost Dogs
 "Goodbye Tennessee" by Jim Post
 "Hungry Man" by Louis Jordan
 "I Don't Care" by Justin Townes Earle
 "Il Treno a Tucumcari" by Bloodhorse
 "Last Hobo" by John Denver
 "Ode to the Road" By Larry Gatlin
 "Route 40" by Leslie Fish
 "Route 66" by Perry Como
 "Truckstop Gospel" by Parker Millsap
 "Tucumcari" by Cex
 "Tucumcari" by Freedy Johnston
 "Tucumcari" by Hugues Aufray
 "Tucumcari" by Jimmie Rodgers
 "Tucumcari" by Randy Kaplan
 "Tucumcari" by Goodnight, Texas
 "Tucumcari, Here I Come" by Dale Watson
 "Tucumcari Woman" by Dan Roberts
 "Two-Gun Harry from Tucumcari" by Dorothy Shay
 "Willin'" by Little Feat

Tulare, California
 "Tulare Dust" by Merle Haggard

Tulsa, Oklahoma
 "200 More Miles" by Cowboy Junkies
 "Almost to Tulsa" by Buddy Charleton
 "Convoy" by C.W. McCall
 "Don't Let the Sun Set on You in Tulsa" by Waylon Jennings
 "Don't Make Me Come to Tulsa" by Wade Hayes
 "Easton and Main" by the Turnpike Troubadours
 "Halfway to Tulsa" by Larry Sparks
 “Hang Me in the Tulsa County Stars” by John Moreland
 "Home Sweet Oklahoma" by Leon Russell
 "Jack Straw" by Grateful Dead
 "Last Trip to Tulsa" by Neil Young
 "Prisoner of the Highway" by Ronnie Milsap
 "Take Me Back to Oklahoma" by Chubby Checker
 "Take Me Back to Oklahoma" by Henson Cargill
 "Take Me Back to Tulsa" by Bob Wills
 "Tampa to Tulsa" by The Jayhawks
 "Tell Me Something Bad About Tulsa" by Merle Haggard
 "The Day That She Left Tulsa" by Wade Hayes
 "The Heart of Rock & Roll" by Huey Lewis and the News
 "The Tulsa Shuffle" by The Tractors
 "Tulsa" by Rufus Wainwright
 "Tulsa" by Wayne "The Train" Hancock
 "Tulsa" by Waylon Jennings
 "Tulsa Baby" by Dave Stogner
 "Tulsa County" by The Byrds
 "Tulsa Girl" by Dwight Twilley
 “Tulsa Heat” by John Moreland
 "Tulsa Queen" by Emmylou Harris
 "Tulsa Sounds Like Trouble to Me" by Shawn Camp
 "Tulsa Straight Ahead" by Jimmy Hall
 "Tulsa Telephone Book" by Tom T. Hall
 "Tulsa Time" by Don Williams and Eric Clapton
 "Tulsa Turnaround" by Kenny Rogers
 "24 Hours From Tulsa" by Gene Pitney
 "You're the Reason God Made Oklahoma" by David Frizzell & Shelly West
 "Where I Come From" by Alan Jackson
 "Rodeo" by Garth Brooks

Washington, D.C.
 "Banned in DC" by Bad Brains
 "The Bourgeois Blues" by Lead Belly
 "Caramel City" by Danko Jones
 "Chocolate City" by Parliament
 "The Community of Hope" by PJ Harvey
  "The District Sleeps Alone Tonight" by The Postal Service
 "Drop the Bomb" by Trouble Funk
 "Washington, D.C." by The Magnetic Fields
 "The Washington Post March" by John Philip Sousa
 "Fifteenth and T" by Swingin' Utters
 "And the Washington Monument Blinks Goodnight" by Q And Not U
 "Metro Song" by Remy Munasifi 
 "Washington D.C." by Gil Scott-Heron
 "Welcome to D.C." by Mambo Sauce
 "D.C. or Nothing" by Wale

Wichita, Kansas
 "Jack Straw" by Grateful Dead
 "Seven Nation Army" by White Stripes
 "True Dreams of Wichita" by Soul Coughing
 "Wichita" by Gillian Welch
 "Wichita" by Gretchen Peters
 "Wichita Ain’t So Far Away" by the Delines
 "Wichita Cathedral" by Butthole Surfers
 "Wichita Lineman" by Glen Campbell
 "Wichita Skyline" by Shawn Colvin

Wildwood, New Jersey
 "Wildwood Days" by Bobby Rydell

Winnemucca, Nevada
 "I've Been Everywhere" by Johnny Cash

Winslow, Arizona
 "Take It Easy" by The Eagles

Ypsilanti, Michigan
 "Ypsilanti" by Washington Lee Osler

"Born in a Trailer" by the Stooges
 "For The Widows In Paradise, For The Fatherless In Ypsilanti" by Sufjan Stevens
 "Ypsilanti" by Protomartyr
 "Ypsilanti Song" by The Ragbirds

Youngstown, Ohio
 "Youngstown" by Bruce Springsteen

Uruguay

Montevideo
 "Montevideo" by Tabaré Cardozo
 "Montevideo" by Hansi Lang
 "La lluvia cae sobre Montevideo" by Traidores
 "Una canción para Montevideo" by Mauricio Ubal
 "Zafar" by La Vela Puerca

Uzbekistan

Samarkand
 "Самарқанд" (Samarqand) by Nasiba Abdullayeva

Venezuela

Caracas
 "Caminando por Caracas" by Piero De Benedictis

Cumaná
 "Maria Lionza" by Rubén Blades

Vietnam

Hanoi
 "Hanoï" by La Grande Sophie
 "Vietnam Glam" by Indochine

Ho Chi Minh City (Saigon)
 "Goodnight Saigon" by Billy Joel
 "Saigon" by Martha and the Muffins
 "Saigon Bride" by Joan Baez
 "Still in Saigon" by the Charlie Daniels Band
 "Saigon" by Barry Sadler
 "Vietnam Glam" by Indochine
 "Vietnam Vet" by Johnny Hallyday

References

External links
 http://www.city-data.com/forum/general-u-s/189565-famous-old-songs-about-your-city-2.html